= Nini =

Nini may refer to:

== Geography ==
- Nini River, Ghana
- Nini Suhien National Park, Ghana

== Film and television ==
- Ninì Tirabusciò: la donna che inventò la mossa, an Italian comedy film
- Nini's Treehouse, a children's television series
- Nini Salazar-Roberts, a character from High School Musical: The Musical: The Series
- Nini Gomez Niní

== People ==
=== Given name ===
- Nini Bulterijs, Belgian composer
- Niní Cáffaro, Dominican singer
- Nini Camps, American folk rock singer-songwriter
- Ninì Gordini Cervi, Italian actress
- Nini Haslund Gleditsch, Norwegian political activist
- Niní Marshall, Argentine humorist and actress
- Nini Ou-yang (born 1996), Taiwanese actress
- Nini Stoltenberg, Norwegian television personality
- Nini Roll Anker, Norwegian novelist and playwright
- Nini Rosso, Italian jazz trumpeter and composer
- Nini Theilade, Danish ballet dancer
- Nini Wacera, Kenyan actress
- Rebecca Ynares, Filipino politician
- Ni Ni, Chinese actress
- Ni Ni Khin Zaw, Burmese pop singer

=== Surname ===
- Achinoam Nini, Israeli musician
- Alessandro Nini, Italian musician
- Enzo Nini, Italian musician

== Other uses ==
- Nini, one of the fuwa (Beijing Olympics mascots)

== See also ==
- Ninni
