= Lugal-zage-si =

Sumerian King

Lugal-Zage-Si 𒈗𒍠𒄀𒋛
- King of Uruk; King of the Land
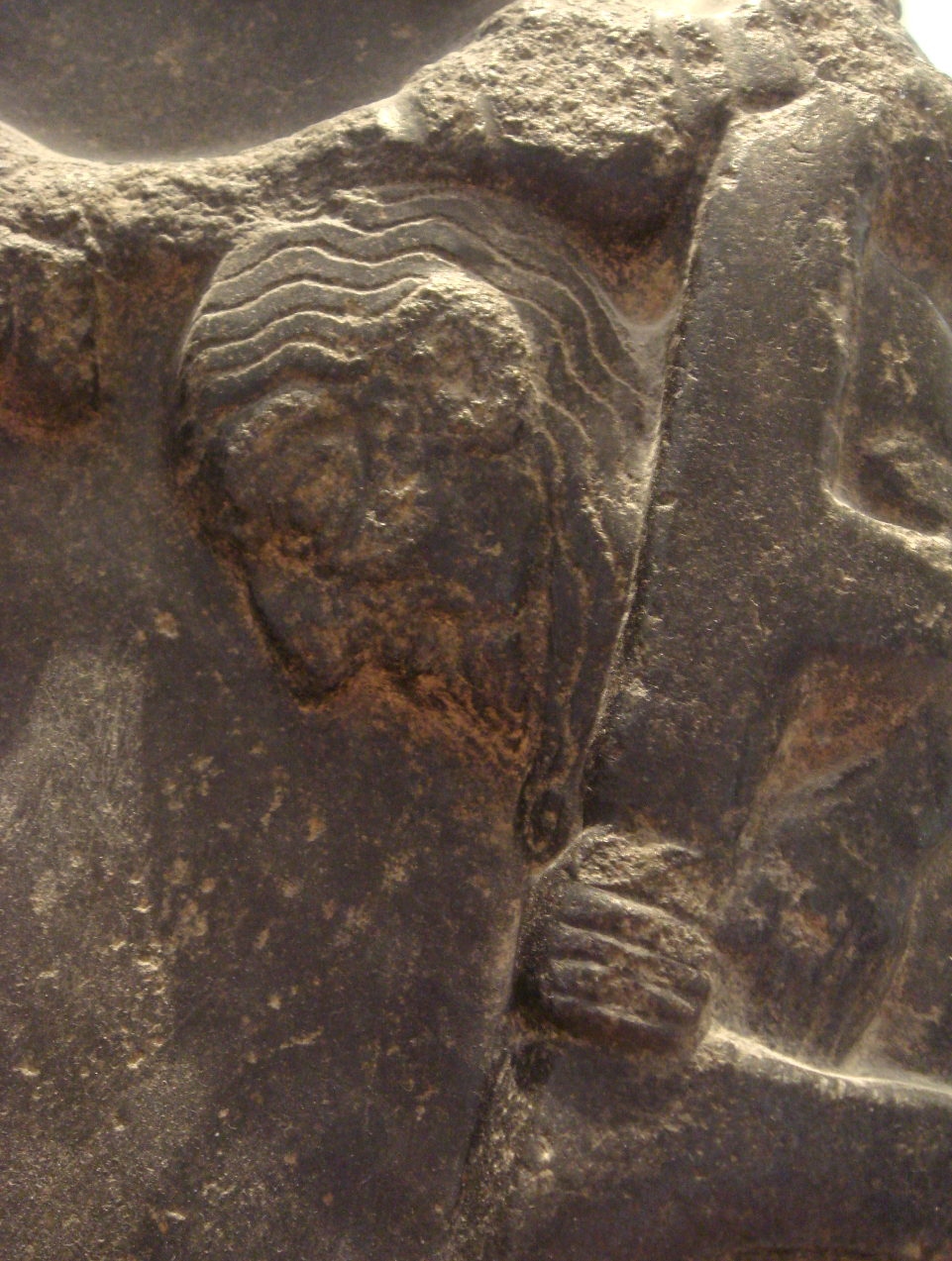
- Prisoner in a cage, probably king Lugalzagesi of Uruk due to his oversize figure, being hit on the head with a mace by Sargon of Akkad. Akkadian Empire victory stele c. 2300 BC. Louvre Museum.

King of Umma
- Reign: c. 2358 – c. 2334 BC
- Predecessor: Ukush
- Successor: Position abolished
- Died: c. 2334 BC
- Dynasty: 3rd Dynasty of Uruk
- Father: Ukush

Lugal-Zage-Si (LUGAL.ZAG.GE.SI 𒈗𒍠𒄀𒋛; frequently spelled Lugalzaggesi, sometimes Lugalzagesi or "Lugal-Zaggisi") of Umma (died c. 2334 BC) was the last Sumerian king before the conquest of Sumer by Sargon of Akkad and the rise of the Akkadian Empire, and was considered as the only king of the third dynasty of Uruk, according to the Sumerian King List. Initially, as king of Umma, he led the final victory of Umma in the generation-long conflict with the city-state Lagash for the fertile plain of Gu-Edin. Following up on this success, he then united Sumer briefly as a single kingdom.

== Filiation ==
According to the Nippur vase of Lugalzagesi, Lugal-Zage-Si was the son of Ukush, governor of Umma:

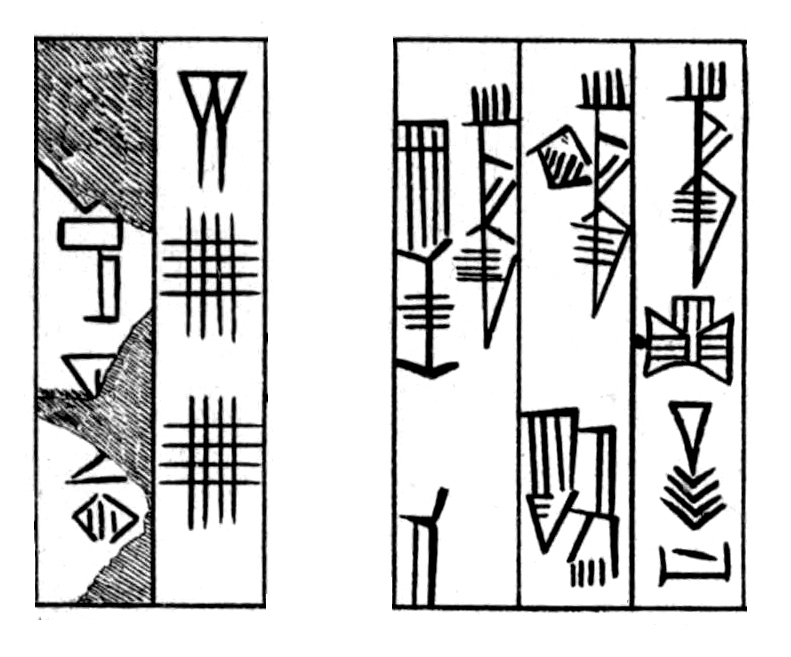
"Lugalzagesi, king of Uruk, king of the Land, (...) son of Ukush, ensi of Umma" in the Nippur vase of Lugalzagesi.

"Lugal-zage-si, King of Uruk, King of the Land, priest of Ana, prophet of Nidaba; the son of Ukush, patesi of Umma, the prophet of Nidaba; he who was favourably regarded by Ana, the king of the lands; the great patesi of Enlil; endowed with understanding by Enki; whose name was spoken by Babbar (the Sun-god), the chief minister of Enzu (the Moon-god), the representative of Babbar, the patron of Ninni, the son of Nidaba, who was nourished with holy milk by Ninkharsag, the servant of the god Mes, who is the priest of Uruk, the pupil of Ninabukkhadu, the mistress of Uruk, the Great Minister of the gods".

— Nippur vase inscription of Lugal-zagesi-si

== Reign ==
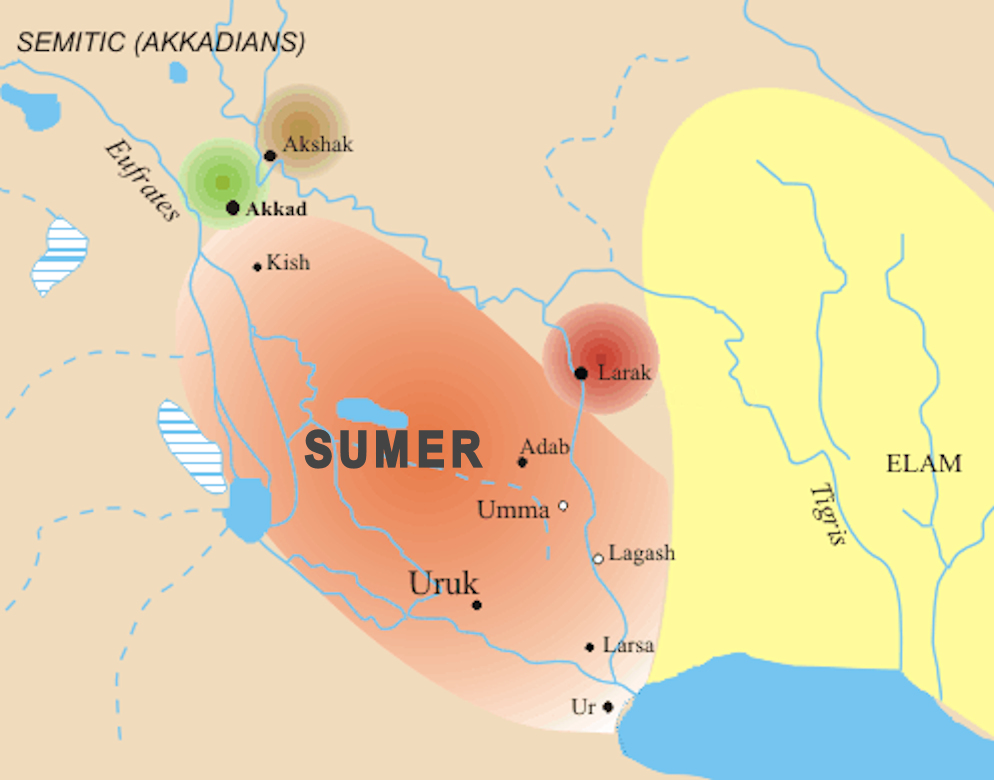
Approximate territory of Sumer under its last king Lugal-Zage-Si, in orange, before the rise of the Akkadian Empire. Circa 2350 BC.

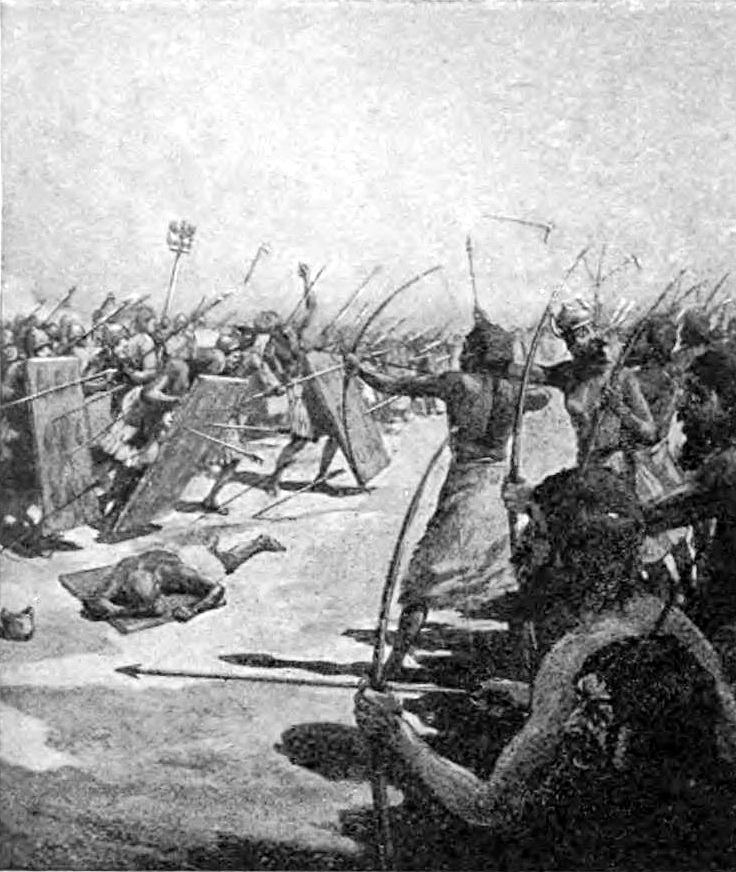
Battle between the Sumerians (left) and the Semites, armed with bows and arrows. 20th century reconstitution.

Lugal-Zage-Si pursued an expansionist foreign policy. He began his career as énsi of Umma, from where he conquered several of the Sumerian city-states. In the seventh year of his reign, Uruk fell under the leadership of Lugal-Zage-Si, énsi of Umma, who ultimately annexed most of the territory of Lagash under king Urukagina, and established the first reliably documented kingdom to encompass all of Sumer. The destruction of Lagash was described in a lament (possibly the earliest recorded example of what would become a prolific Sumerian literary genre), which stressed that:

"The man of Umma ... committed a sin against Ningirsu. ... Offence there was none in Urukagina, king of Girsu, but as for Lugal-Zage-Si, governor of Umma, may his goddess Nisaba make him carry his sin upon his neck" (alternatively – "may she carry his sin upon her neck").

— Lament about the fall of Lagash, by Urukagina

Later, Lugal-Zage-Si invaded Kish, where he overthrew Ur-Zababa, Ur, Nippur, and Larsa; as well as Uruk, where he established his new capital. He ruled for 25 (or 34) years according to the Sumerian King List.

Lugal-Zage-Si claimed in his inscription that Enlil gave to him "all the lands between the upper and the lower seas", that is, between the Mediterranean Sea and the Persian Gulf:

"When Enlil, the king of all the lands, gave the kingship of the Land to Lugalzagesi, he justifyed "eyes" of the Land; he made all the lands throw themselves at his feet; from the rising of the sun to the setting of the sun, he made them prostrate before him."

— Nippur vase inscription of Lugalzagesi.

Although his incursion to the Mediterranean was, in the eyes of some modern scholars, not much more than "a successful raiding party", the inscription "marks the first time that a Sumerian prince claimed to have reached what was, for them, the western edge of the world". (Historical accounts from much later tablets asserted that Lugal-Anne-Mundu of Adab, a slightly earlier king, had also conquered as far as the Mediterranean and the Taurus mountains, but contemporary records for the entire period before Sargon are still far too tenuous to permit scholars to reconstruct actual events with great confidence.)

Lugal-Zage-Si himself was in turn defeated and his kingdom was annexed by Sargon of Akkad. According to later Babylonian versions of Sargon's inscriptions, Sargon of Akkad captured Lugal-Zage-Si after destroying the walls of Uruk, and led him in a neck-stock to Enlil's temple in Nippur:

"Sargon, king of Akkad, overseer of Inanna, king of Kish, anointed of Anu, king of the land, governor of Enlil: he defeated the city of Uruk and tore down its walls, in the battle of Uruk he won, took Lugalzagesi king of Uruk in the course of the battle, and led him in a collar to the gate of Enlil".

— Inscription of Sargon (Old Babylonian copy from Nippur).

== Nippur vase of Lugalzagesi ==
The Nippur vase contains an extensive dedicatory inscription by Lugalzagesi, which has been reconstructed from the fragments of the vase:

Nippur vase inscription of Lugalzagesi

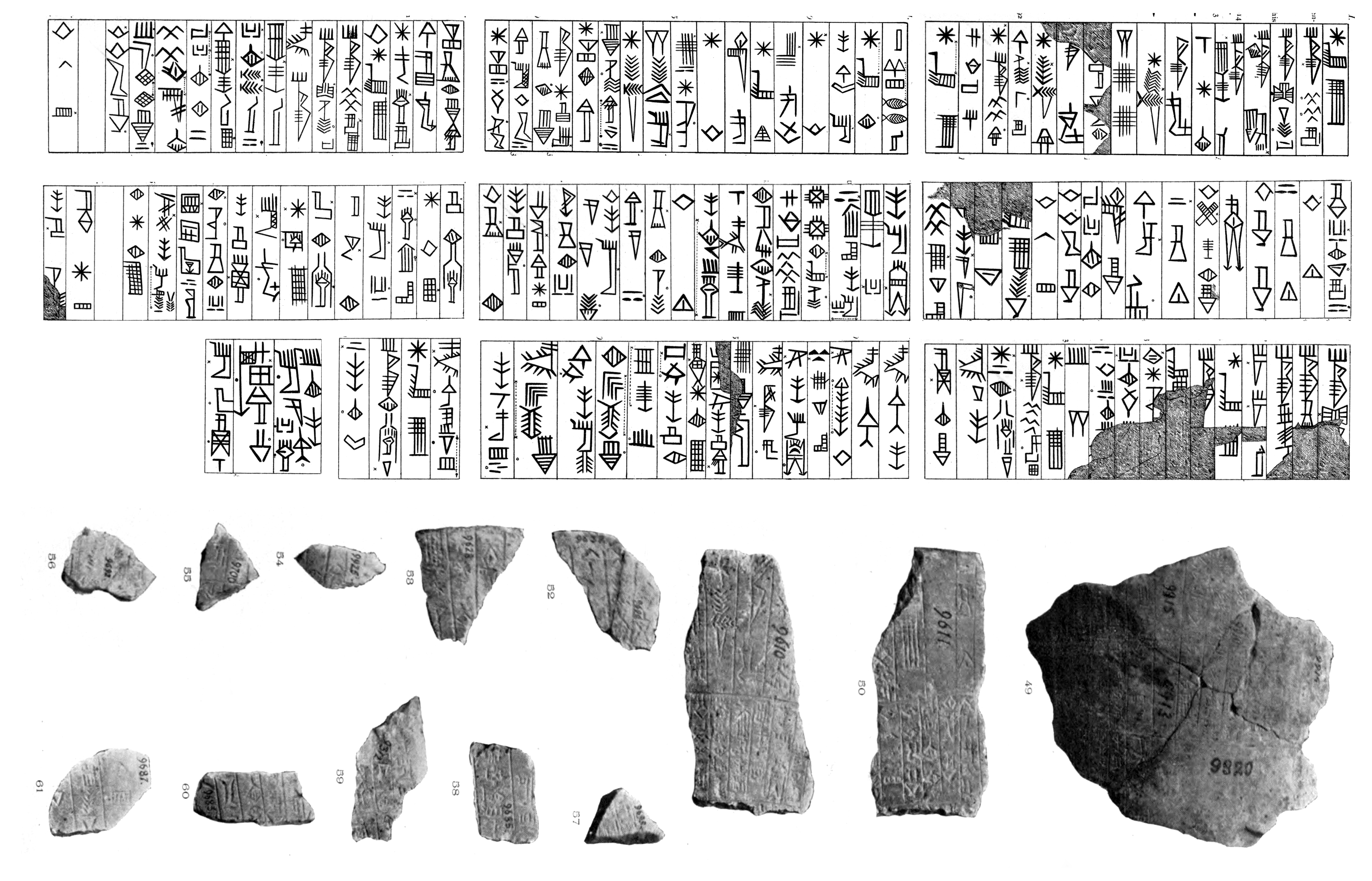
Nippur vase of Lugalzagesi, reconstructed text, and some of the fragments.

"For Enlil, king of all the lands - Lugalzagesi, king of Uruk, king of the nation, incantation-priest of An, lumaḫ-priest of Nisaba, son of U-U, ruler of Umma and lumaḫ-priest of Nisaba, looked upon truly by An the king of all the lands, chief ruler of Enlil, given wisdom by Enki, nominated by Utu, chief minister of Suen, military governor of Utu, one who provides for Inanna, son born of Nisaba, fed rich milk by Ninhursaga, a man of Mes-sanga-Unuga, servant raised by Ningirim the queen of Uruk, chief steward of the gods -

When Enlil, king of all the lands, had given to Lugalzagesi the kingship of the nation, and had let the eyes of the nation be directed toward him, and had placed all the lands at his feet, and had made lands from east to west subject to him, then, from the sea, the lower one, along the Tigris and the Euphrates to the sea the upper one, he put their roads in proper order for him. From east to west Enlil let him have no rival. All the lands in riverine meadows rested (contentedly) under him, and the nation was happily making merry under him. All those on thrones in Sumer and the rulers of foreign lands, they determine(?) for him the divine power of princeship unto the land of Uruk. In those days, Uruk spent its days under him in rejoicing. Ur, like a bull, did lift up its head skyward under him. Larsa, the beloved city of Utu, happily made merry under him. Umma, the beloved city of Šara, lifted up its great horns under him. The land of Zabala, like an ewe stripped of a lamb, did cry out under him. Ki'ana lifted up its neck skyward under him.

Lugalzagesi, king of Uruk and king of the nation, solicitously(?) serves very large food offerings to Enlil his master in Nippur, and he pours out sweet water for him. If Enlil, king of all the lands, should say to An, his beloved father, a prayer on my behalf, may he add to my life (additional) life! May the land in riverine meadows rest (contentedly) under me, may the people like sweet-smelling grasses spread out widely under me, may the breast of heaven function properly under me, and may the nation behold a pleasant place under me. May the favorable destiny, which they (An and Enlil) have determined, never alter for me! May I be forever a proud shepherd! He dedicated it (this vessel) to Enlil, his beloved master, for his life".

== Other inscriptions and sculptures ==
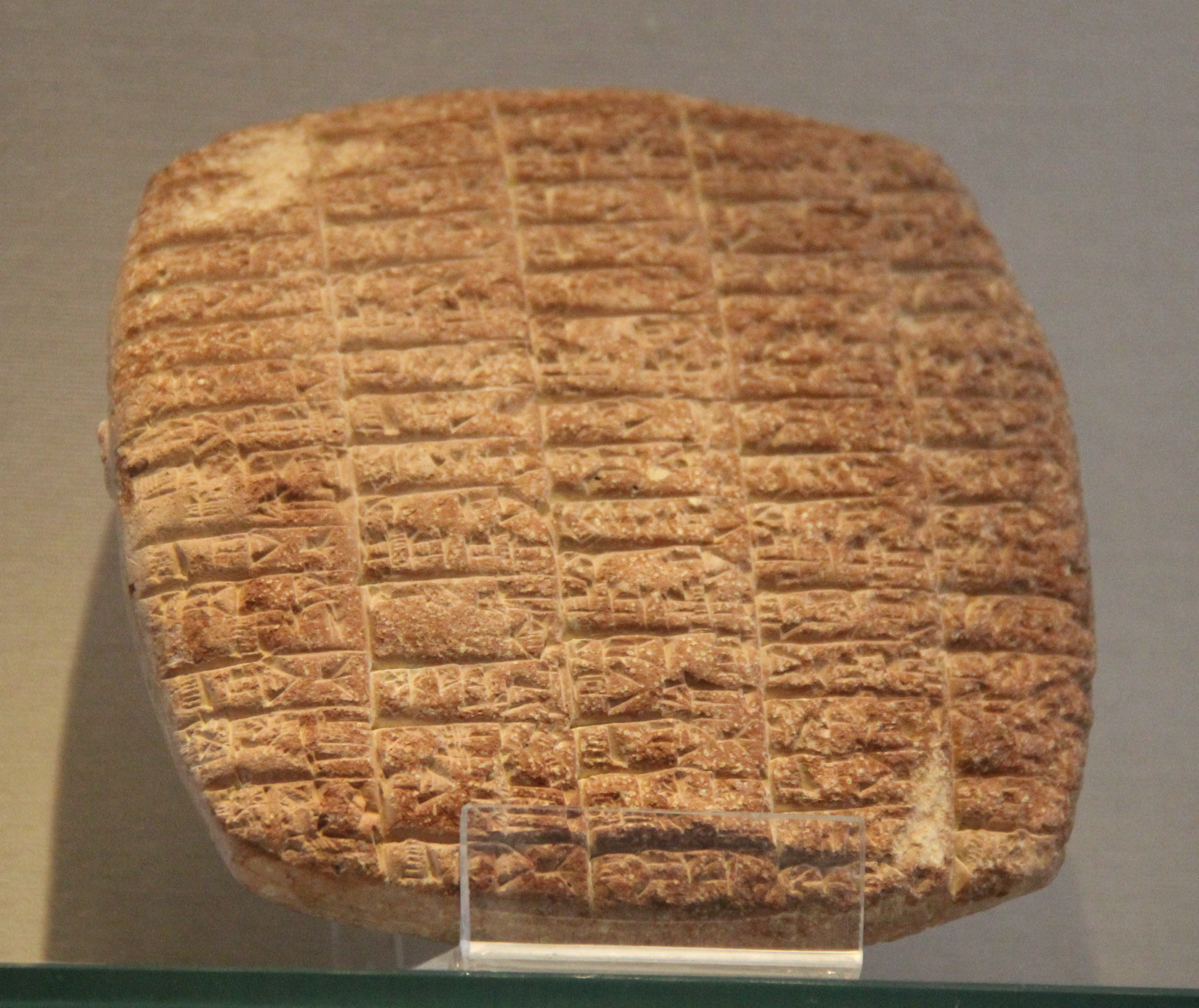
Lamentation about the fall of Lagash to Lugalzagesi, Urukagina period, circa 2350 BCE Tello, ancient Girsu.

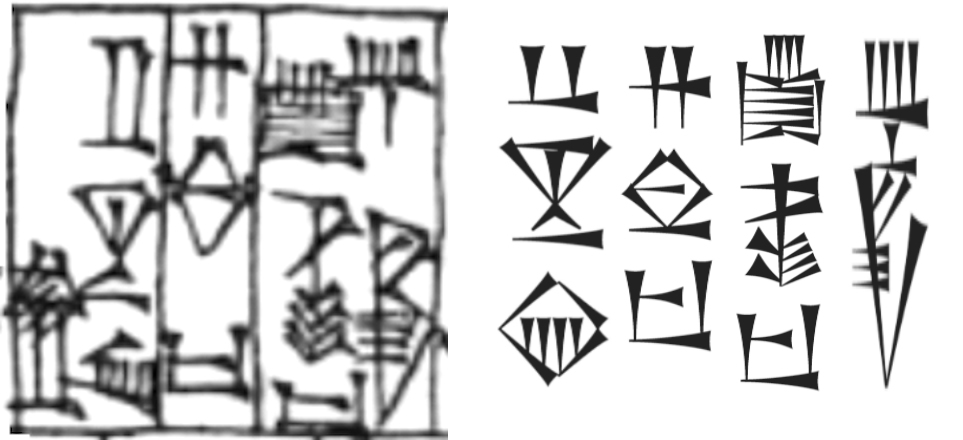
"Lugalzagesi, Governor of Umma" (𒈗𒍠𒄀𒋛 𒑐𒋼𒋛 𒄑𒆵𒆠, Lugalzagesi ensi Ummaki) in the "Lamentation about the ruin of Lagash".

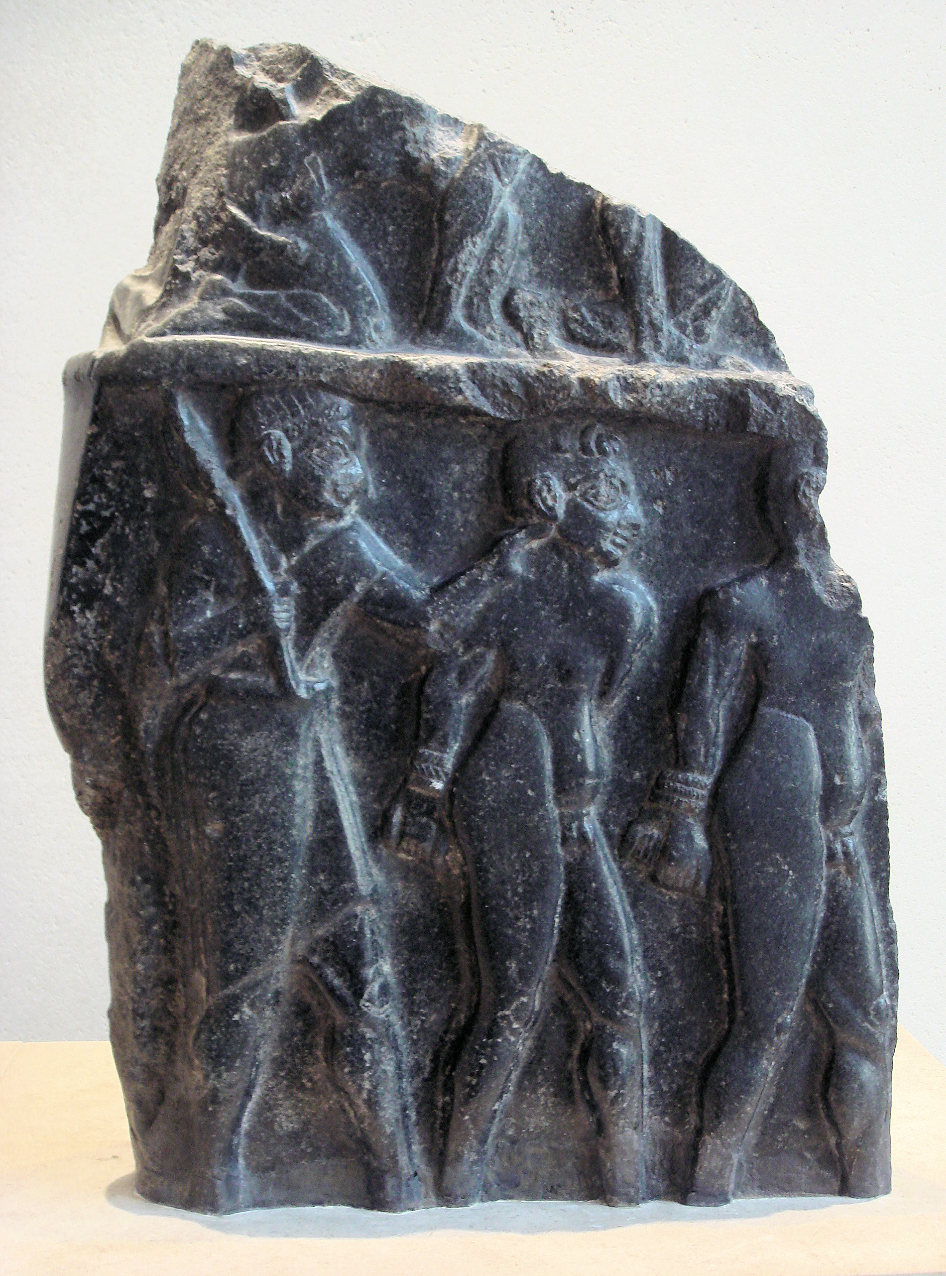
Prisoners escorted by a soldier, on a victory stele of Sargon of Akkad, circa 2300 BCE. The hairstyle of the prisoners (curly hair on top and short hair on the sides) is characteristic of Sumerians, as also seen on the Standard of Ur. Louvre Museum.

== See also ==
- History of Sumer

Regnal titles
Preceded by Ukush	King of Umma c. 2358 – c. 2334 BC	Succeeded by Sargon of Akkad
Preceded by Ur-Zababa in Kish	King of Sumer c. 2358 – c. 2334 BC	Succeeded by Sargon of Akkad
Preceded by Enshakushanna	Ensi of Uruk c. 2358 – c. 2334 BC	Succeeded by Sargon of Akkad
