= Apišal =

Ancient city in Iraq

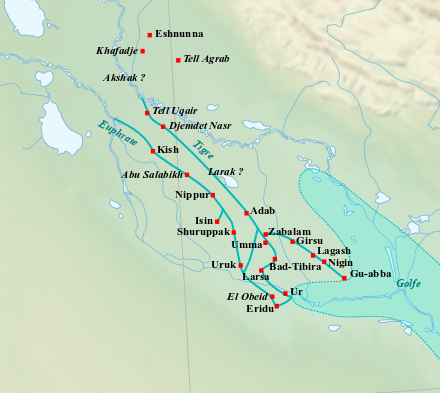
Lower Mesopotamia

Apišal (A-pi_{4}-sal_{4}^{ki}) is an ancient Near Eastern city known from the 2nd half of the 3rd millennium BC in the Akkadian Empire period and especially the Ur III Empire period. In Ur III times it was one of four districts of the Umma province along with Da-Umma, Gu’edena, and Mušbiana. It is currently unlocated though it is known to be in the northeastern area of Umma on the Tigris river though it was originally thought to be near Mari due to conflating it with Abarsal. There are no historical mentions of Apišal after the end of the 3rd millennium BC though it does appear in literary and omen texts into the 1st millennium BC. The site of Tell Muhalliqiya has been proposed as its location.

In the Ur III period institutions called "mar-sa" handled harbor administration and its related activities including boat building and repairing and storage of raw material. There was a "mar-sa" at Apišal. It is also known that there was a "weir of Apišal" which supports the notion Apišal was on a river or major canal. Also at that time Apišal is known to have held one of the four guesthouses (e_{2}-kas_{4} a-pi-sal_{4}^{ki}), for messengers and traders, in the Umma province. It is associated with the guesthouse in Pašime.

Apišal is mentioned in a number of Mesopotamian omen (extispicy) texts. An example:

"If the liver has two Fingers and there is a Weapon on the right of the gall-bladder and it points to the left (and) [in front of it] there are seven splits (and) there is a hole var. there are holes on the left of the gall-bladder, it is an omen of Narām-Sîn [who by] this [om]en marched against Apišal and made a [brea]ch, captured Rēš-Adad, the king of Apišal, and the chief minister of Apišal"

In that period rulers, towns, and religious institutions had "banners" complete with silver, or silver and gold at the highest level. Apišal is known to have had its own banner. Besides being known as a source for "good beer" it is known to have been a significant supplier of wool and of fish, the later being sometimes shipped "upstream" to Nippur, as well as a having a granary.

The city is also featured in the later fragmentary Sumerian literary composition Narām-Sîn and the Lord of Apišal (BM 139965).

== History ==
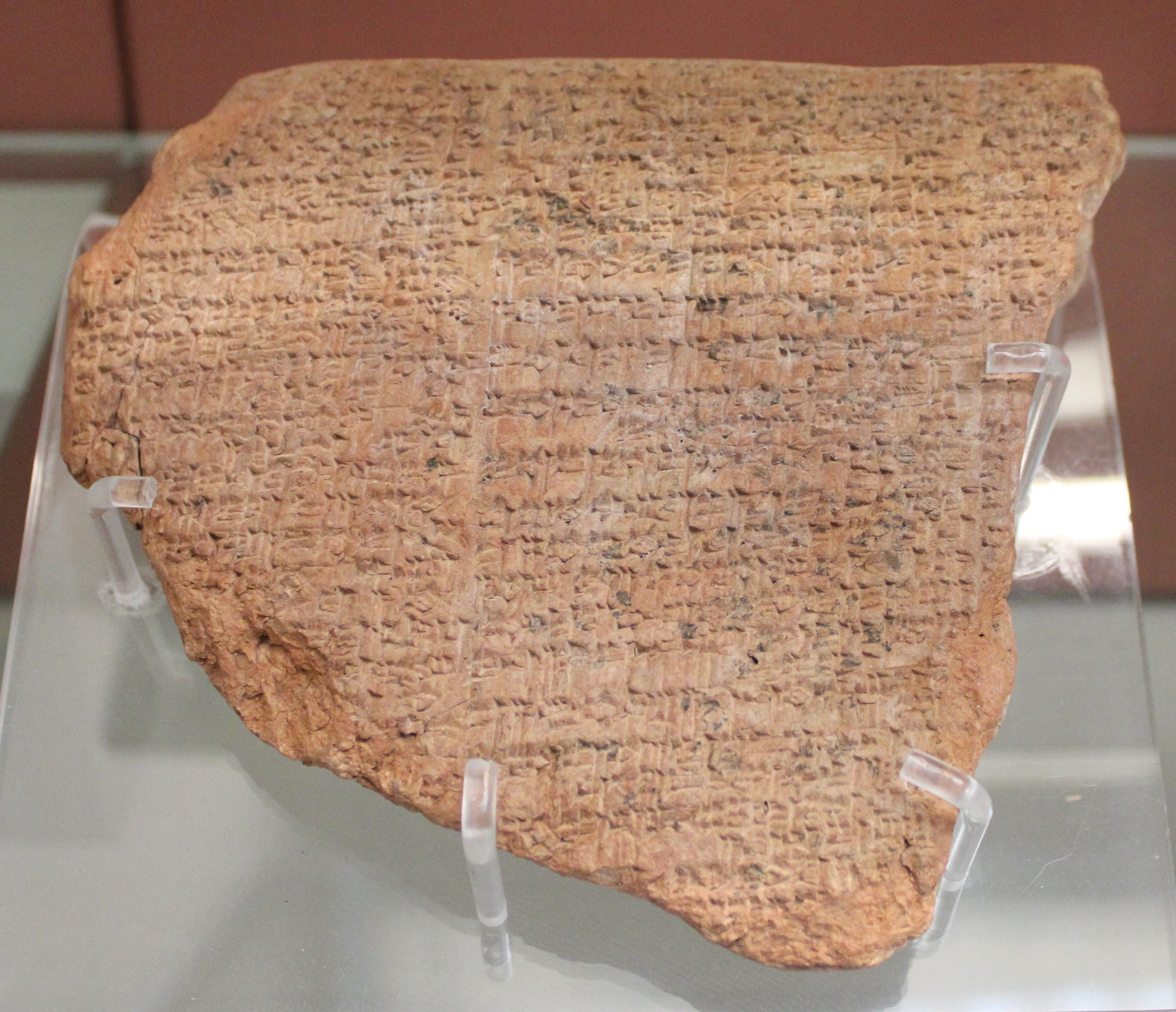
Naram-Sîn in Apišal

Akkadian Empire period texts from Susa mention Apišal. Some commercial texts refer to emmer wheat brought from there. Some translations of the text about the widespread revolt against Akkad ruler Naram-Sin of Akkad (c. 2255–2218 BC) name Apišal as one of the revolting cities. In that recension the ruler of Apišal is named as Ri-iš-^{d}Adad.

While essentially all textual mentions of Apišal come from the late 3rd millennium BC period, primarily from the Ur III Empire, it has been suggested that the city was mentioned in the early 2nd millennium Old Babylonian period in the region around Ebla, Mari, and Alalakh partly based on a presumed equivalence of Abarsal and Apišal. A text (c. 1786–1776) from Mari, a letter from Yasmah-Addu to Aplahanda of Kargemish, mentioned a ruler Mekum of possibly Apišal. A tablet from Alalakh, again based on the Abarsal correspondence, is said to suggest that a Nawar-adal was a ruler of Apišal in this period.

== Religion ==
Ur III period texts show regular offerings (sá-du₁₁ diĝir-re-ne) for Šara of Apišal ((^{d}Šára A-pi_{4}-sal_{4}^{ki})), Ninura of Apišal, and Šulgi of Apišal. Similar offerings were made to Šara of KI.AN (^{d}Šára KI.AN^{ki}) and Šara of Anzubbar (^{d}Šára-^{an}Ánzu^{mušen}-bábbar). There was also a priestess of Iškur (Haddad) in Apišal. A Nin-Zabala (Inanna of Zabalam) of Apisal is also mentioned. In some texts Šulgi of Apišal is replaced by Lamma-lugal (Lamma-Sulgira) of Apišal. The Lamma-lugal, the embodiment of an deified Ur III ruler, is not fully understood though it has been suggested that it took the form of a statue. There was also known to be a ^{d}Lamma-lugal KI.AN^{ki} Another text reads "1 1/2 sila3 of good ghee, oil of the emblem of Nin-ura of Apisal". And another "good reed, fodder for the fattening sheep, the regular offerings of Šara, torn out in the field of Naram-Sin, to the sheep fold in Apišal carried". It is known that the Šara cult center in Apišal produced beer based on a text showing that 1,950 liters of "good beer" has been provided to the governor that year.

== Location ==
Earlier on Apišal was speculated to be in Syria. Now it is generally considered to be in the area of Umma. In the late 3rd millennium BC Umma, originally an independent kingdom then a province of the Ur III Empire, contained the major cities of Umma and Apišal (followed by Guedena, Kamari, KI.AN, Karkar, Edana, Guab and Nagsu). Apišal is known to have been near the border with Lagash based on texts. Also a location in Lagash was named "Apisal i.dub = Apišal silo". There are two known large archaeological sites in the Umma region which show occupation in the late 3rd millennium BC, Tell Jidr which is thought to be Karkar and Tell Zichariya (WS 213).

Apišal is known to have been on the Tigris river. Apišal is known to have provided the personnel for the "roadhouse" of Pashime which lay on the nearby Persian Gulf coast to the east.

One proposal for the location of Apišal is Muhallaqiya (Tell Muhalliqiya, Tell Mehaliqyyat) partly based on its location on the Tigris in the northeastern area of Umma and its 30 kilometer distance from Umma, it being known that Apišal was 2 or 3 walking days from Umma. The ancient course of the Tigris passing the site was detected on satellite imagery.

It is known that 15 man-days were expended floating a boat from Apišal to E-duru_{5}-ma-ri, the "Mari village" There was a "Elamites' Village" in Lagash. A tablet reports "barges of 60 gur (capacity), 2 ban2 (per day) each, their skippers piloting, ... from Apišal to Nippur, with wool filled ..." A number of barges being sent to Nippur are recorded. Shipments of grain were also shipped by boat from Apišal to Garšana. Another text records a 19 day journey from Puzrish-Dagan via the Id-Ka-sahar canal to the Tigris and thence down to Apišal.

== See also ==
- Cities of the ancient Near East
- List of Mesopotamian deities
- List of Mesopotamian dynasties
