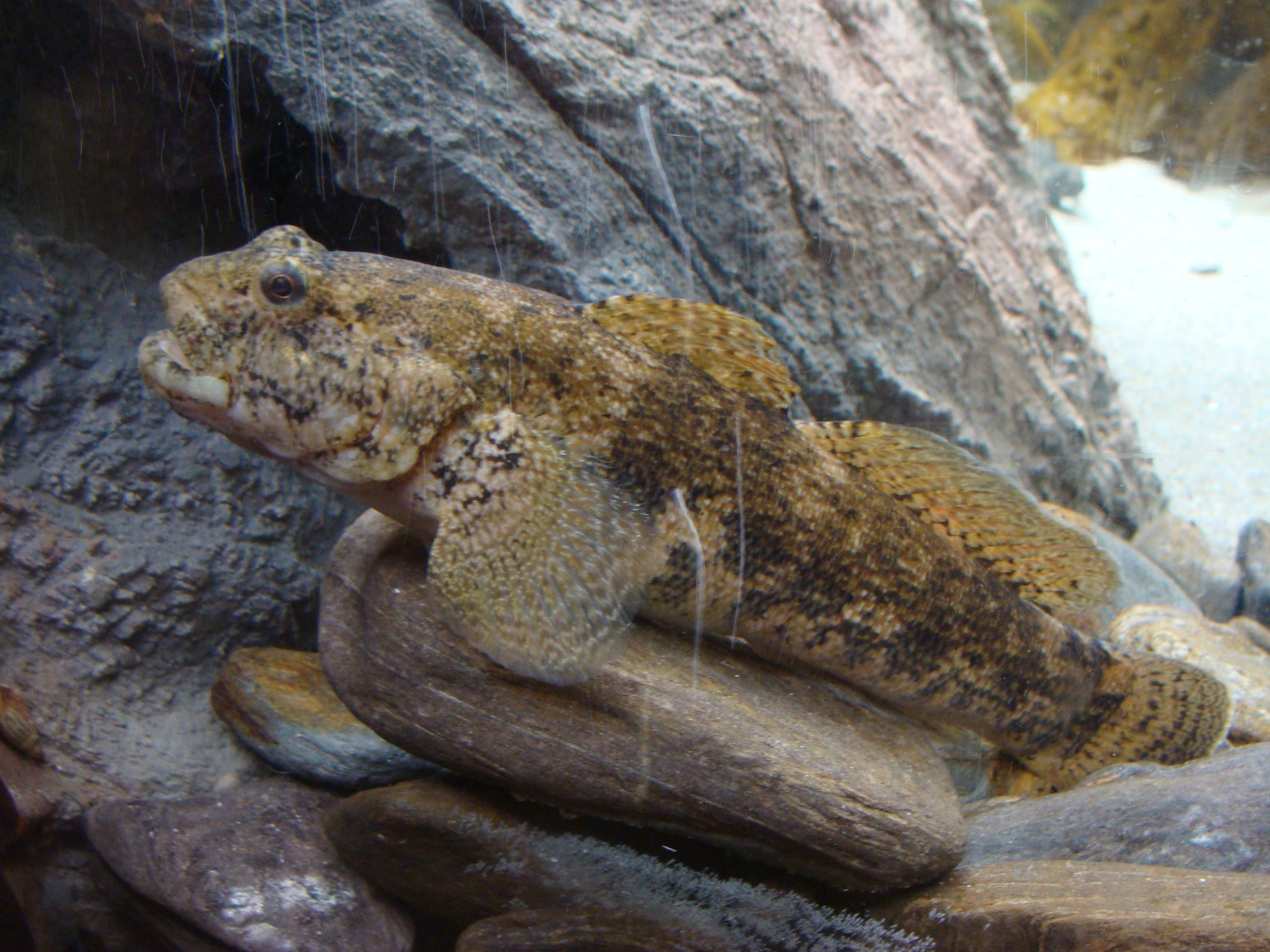
- The total view of the giant goby from Spain

Conservation status
- Least Concern (IUCN 3.1)

Scientific classification
- Kingdom: Animalia
- Phylum: Chordata
- Class: Actinopterygii
- Division: Teleostei
- Order: Gobiiformes
- Family: Gobiidae
- Genus: Gobius
- Species: G. cobitis

Binomial name
- Gobius cobitis Pallas, 1814

Synonyms
- Macrogobius cobitis (Pallas, 1814); Gobius guttatus Valenciennes, 1837; Gobius limbatus Valenciennes, 1837; Gobius algarbiensis Capello, 1880; Gobius spilogonurus Cocco, 1885 (ambiguous name); Gobius exanthematosus gibbosus Ninni, 1938

= Giant goby =

Species of fish

The giant goby (Gobius cobitis) is a species of goby native to coastal marine and brackish waters of the eastern Atlantic, the Mediterranean Sea and the Black Sea at depths of 10 to 35 metres (33 to 115 ft). This species is of minor importance to commercial fisheries and is also popular as a game fish.

== Description ==
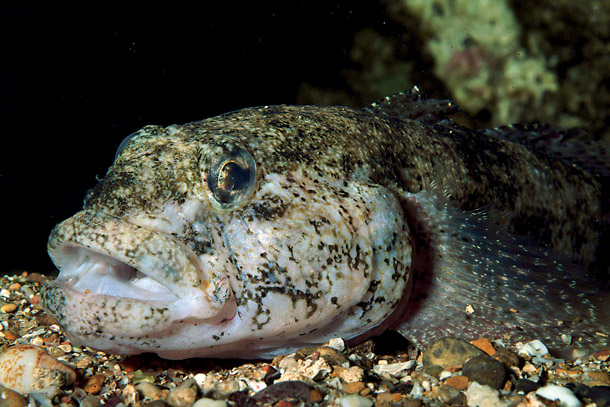
The head of the giant goby from Italy

The giant goby, which grows to 27 centimetres (11 in) in length, is greyish to olive brown with 'pepper and salt' markings. These are especially notable in smaller specimens. In the breeding season the male is darker than the female. The body is covered in small scales, and the tail stalk is short. The eyes are small.

== Habitat ==
The giant goby inhabits rock pools high up in the intertidal zone of sheltered shores. Occupied pools typically contain boulders under which the giant goby can take shelter, and have inputs of freshwater, so the water in the pools is usually brackish.

== Diet ==
This species has been recorded to feed upon polychaete worms, green algae of the genus Ulva, amphipods, crabs and insects.

== Range ==
In the UK, the giant goby occurs only on the south coast, ranging along the southern West Country coast between Wembury in southwest Devon and the Isles of Scilly. Outside of the UK, it is found from the western English Channel to Morocco, in the Mediterranean, the Black Sea and the Gulf of Suez, more than likely a Lessepsian migrant via the Suez Canal.

== Threats ==
In 1992, giant gobies were absent from one site in south Devon and one from south Cornwall, which are parts of the historic range. It was assumed that the species was in decline, but the species was recorded again in the south Cornwall site in 1998. Although there is no evidence that the species is endangered in the UK, it seems likely that it is vulnerable to human disturbance due to the recreational pressures on the shore habitat.

== Conservation ==
In Great Britain in 1998 the species was added to Schedule 5 of the Wildlife and Countryside Act 1981. Under this Act it is an offence to kill, injure, take or sell giant gobies, or to damage or destroy any structure or place used by a giant goby for shelter or protection. Furthermore, it is included in English Nature's Species Recovery Programme.
