= Ukush =

Ukush 𒌑𒌑
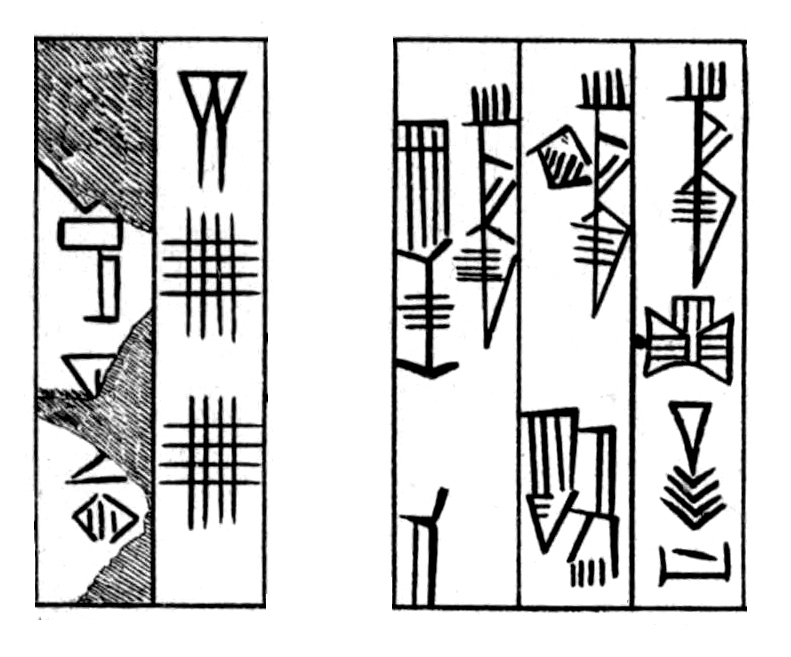
- "Lugalzagesi, king of Uruk, king of the Land, (...) son of Ukush, ensi of Umma", ("son of Ukush": 𒌉 𒌑𒌑, dumu u_{2}-kuš_{3}) in the Nippur vase of Lugalzagesi

King of Umma
- Reign: c. 2358 BC
- Predecessor: Gishakidu
- Successor: Lugal-zage-si
- Died: c. 2358 BC
- Issue: Lugal-zage-si

Location of Umma

Ukush, also sometimes Uu or Bubu (Sumerian: 𒌑𒌑, which can be read u_{2}-kuš_{3} or u_{2}-u_{2}; died c. 2358 BC) was a Sumerian ruler (ensi) of the city-state of Umma. He was the father of Lugal-zage-si who took control over all of Sumer.

Ukush is known from the Nippur vase inscription of Lugal-Zage-Si:

"Lugal-zagesi-si, King of Uruk, King of the Land, priest of Ana, prophet of Nidaba; the son of Ukush, patesi of Umma, the prophet of Nidaba; he who was favourably regarded by Ana, the king of the lands; the great patesi of Enlil; endowed with understanding by Enki; whose name was spoken by Babbar (the Sun-god), the chief minister of Enzu (the Moon-god), the representative of Babbar, the patron of Ninni, the son of Nidaba, who was nourished with holy milk by Ninkharsag, the servant of the god Mes, who is the priest of Uruk, the pupil of Ninabukkhadu, the mistress of Uruk, the Great Minister of the gods".

— Nippur vase inscription of Lugal-zagesi-si.

Other inscriptions, such as an inscription on a brick with a central hole in the Bible Lands Museum, also mention Lugalzagesi as "son of Ukush" (𒌉 𒌑𒌑, dumu u_{2}-u_{2}). Another dedicatory inscription is also known.

It is thought that he played an important role in making Umma a strong city with a powerful army, which allowed his son to achieve the defeat of neighbouring and traditional rival Lagash and its king Urukagina, and then the conquest of all Sumer.

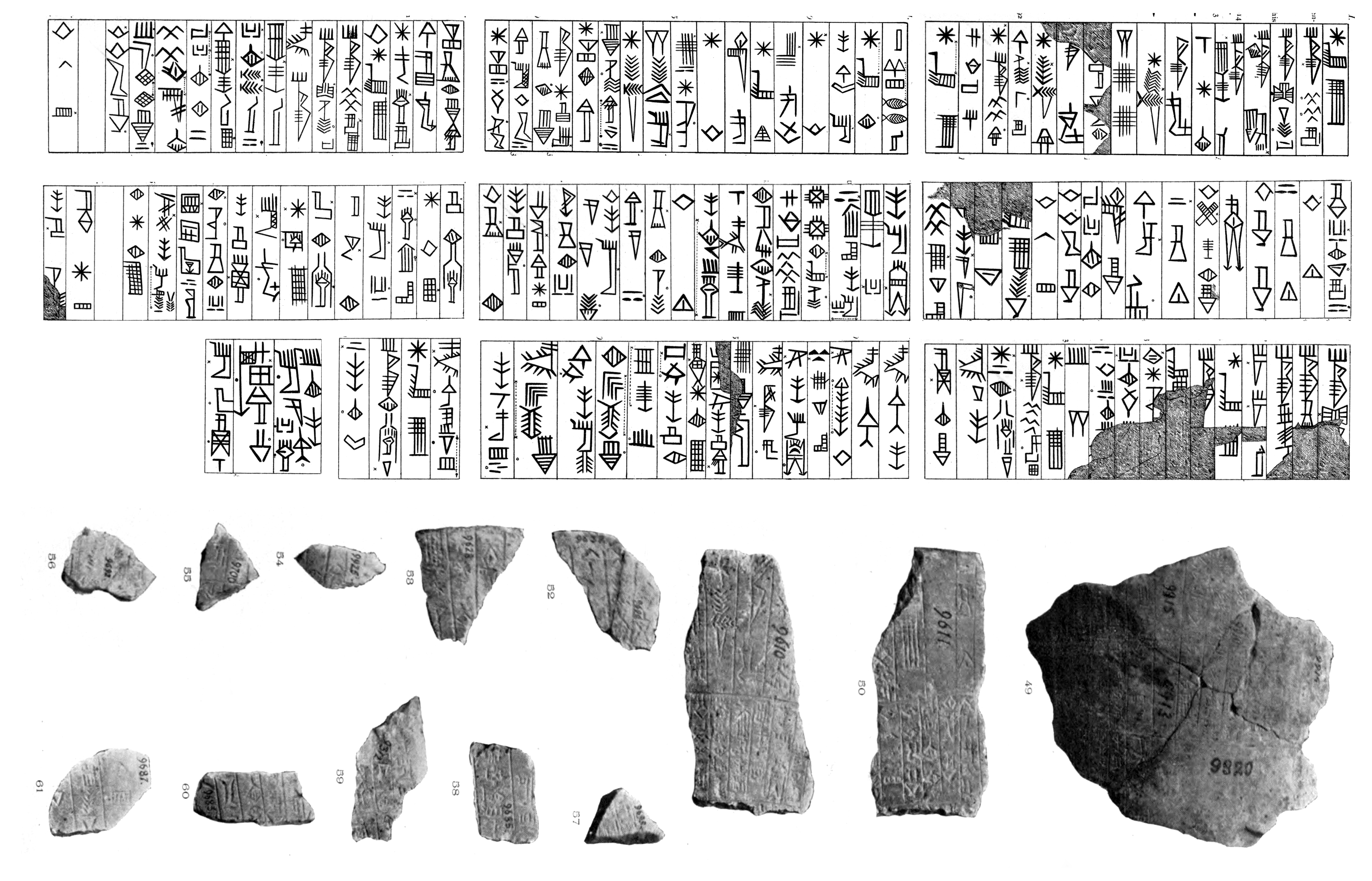
Nippur vase of Lugalzagesi, where Lugalzagesi describes himself as "son of Ukush" (𒌉 𒌑𒌑, dumu u_{2}-kuš_{3}, in the 9th column from top right)

== See also ==
- History of Sumer

Regnal titles
Preceded by Gishakidu	King of Umma c. 2358 BC	Succeeded by Lugal-zage-si
