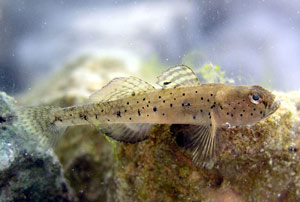

Conservation status
- Least Concern (IUCN 3.1)

Scientific classification
- Kingdom: Animalia
- Phylum: Chordata
- Class: Actinopterygii
- Order: Gobiiformes
- Family: Oxudercidae
- Genus: Ninnigobius
- Species: N. canestrinii

Binomial name
- Ninnigobius canestrinii (A. P. Ninni, 1883)

Synonyms
- Gobius canestrinii A. P. Ninni, 1883; Pomatoschistus canestrinii (A. P. Ninni, 1883); Gobius jadrensis Giglioli, 1883

= Canestrini's goby =

Species of fish

Ninnigobius canestrinii, Canestrini's goby, is a species of goby native to fresh and brackish waters along the Adriatic coasts where it is known to occur from the Po delta, Italy to Neretva, Croatia. It has also been introduced in Lake Trasimeno, Italy. This species prefers areas with sand or mud substrates in lagoons, lakes and medium-sized to large-sized rivers. This species can reach a length of 5.5 centimetres (2.2 in) TL. The specific name honours the Italian biologist Giovanni Canestrini (1835-1900).
