= Nini River =

Location
- Country: Ghana

Physical characteristics
- Mouth: Tano River
  - coordinates: 5°25′0″N 2°36′0″W
- Length: 10 km (6.2 mi)
- Discharge
  - location: Mouth

The Nini is a river in south-western Ghana. It is one of the rivers for which the Nini-Suhien National Park (now incorporated into the Ankasa Conservation Area) was named. It flows into the Tano River.
