= Ankasa Conservation Area =

Park located in Western Region, Ghana

- Location within Ghana
- Location: Ghana
- Nearest city: Axim
- Coordinates: 5°17′00″N 2°39′00″W
- Area: 50,000 ha (190 sq mi)

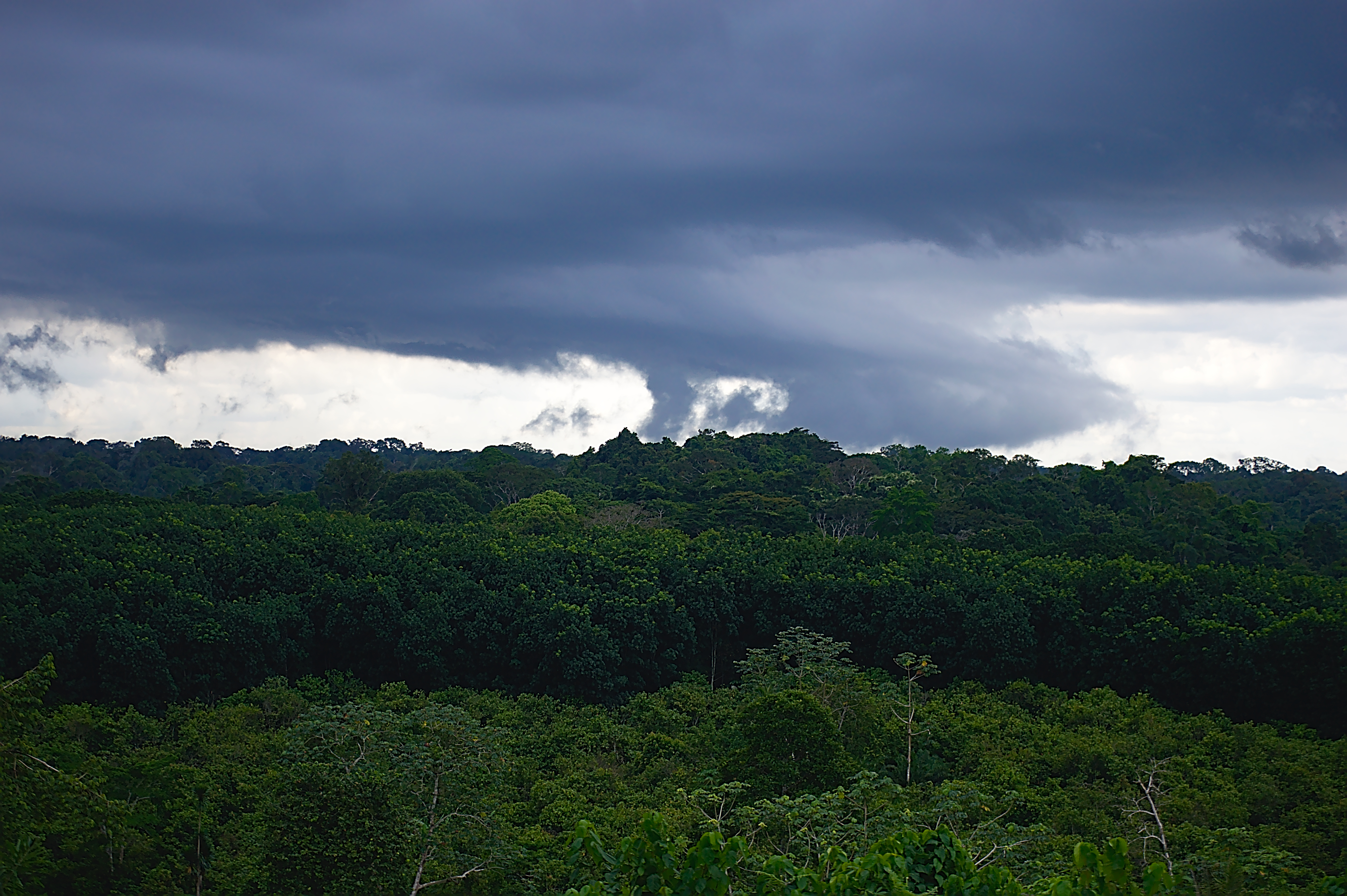
Aerial view of the Ankasa Forest

The Ankasa Conservation Area is located in southwestern Ghana, approximately 365 kilometers west of Accra, near the border with Côte d'Ivoire. It encompasses the Nini Suhien National Park to the north and the Ankasa Forest Reserve to the south.

== Geography and environment ==
The park is approximately 500 square kilometers and consists largely of tropical evergreen rainforest. The Ankasa Conservation Area is the only wildlife protected area in Ghana that is located in the wet evergreen tropical high rainforest belt.

The Ankasa, Nini, and Suhien Rivers all pass through the park and are known for their rapids and waterfalls. The forest has the most biological diversity of any in Ghana, with over 800 vascular plant species, 639 butterfly species, and more than 190 bird species. Animal life includes the elephan, bongo, leopard, western chimpanzee, Diana monkey, and other primates. Apart from the forest reserve, which was selectively logged until 1976, the rest of the protected area is almost intact.

The Ankasa reserve, along with the Nini-Sushien National Park, has been designated an Important Bird Area (IBA) by BirdLife International because it supports significant populations of many bird species.

== Access ==
The park hosts viable populations of large and charismatic wildlife. The table below contains the list of wildlife found in the park.

Category	Species	Notes
Mammal	Forest Elephant	Endangered
Mammal	Leopard	Rare predator
Mammal	Bongo	Forest antelope
Mammal	Yellow-backed Duiker	Largest duiker
Mammal	Maxwell's Duiker	Small antelope
Mammal	Black Duiker	Forest antelope
Mammal	White-naped Sooty Mangabey	Endangered primate
Mammal	Diana Monkey	Rare monkey
Mammal	Geoffroy's Pied Colobus	Rare colobus
Mammal	Western Chimpanzee*	Reported
Mammal	Giant Pangolin	Threatened
Mammal	Giant Forest Hog	Largest wild pig
Bird	White-breasted Guineafowl	Rare endemic
Bird	Yellow-throated Olive Greenbul	Forest bird
Bird	Rufous-winged Illadopsis	Rainforest bird
Bird	Piping Hornbill	Forest hornbill
Reptile	Various forest snakes	Various species
Butterfly	Over 600 butterfly species	High diversity

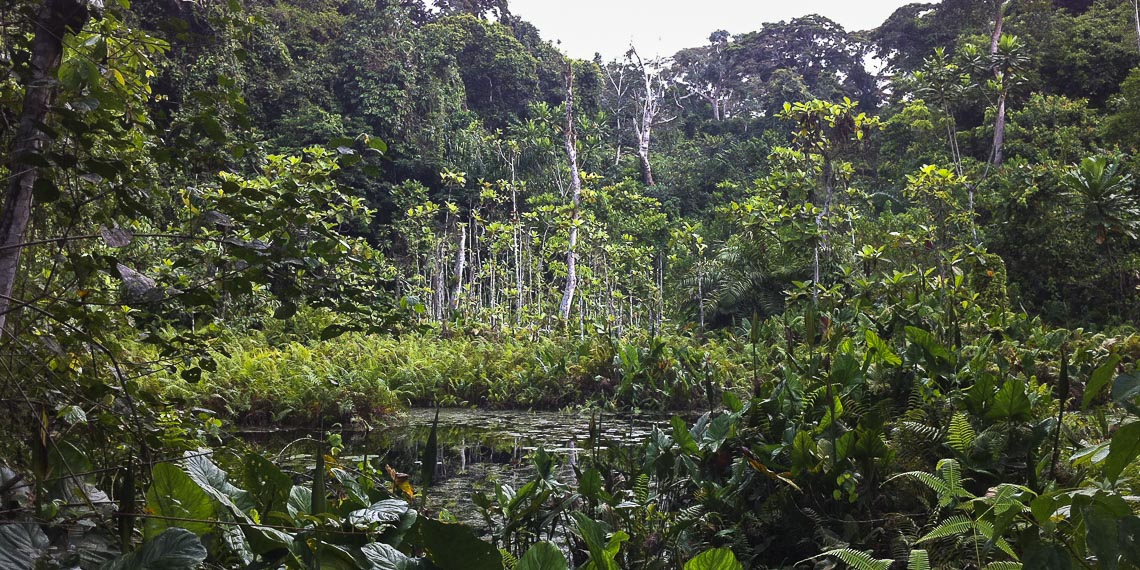
Ankasa Forest

== Gallery ==
Pictures of Ankasa Conservation Area
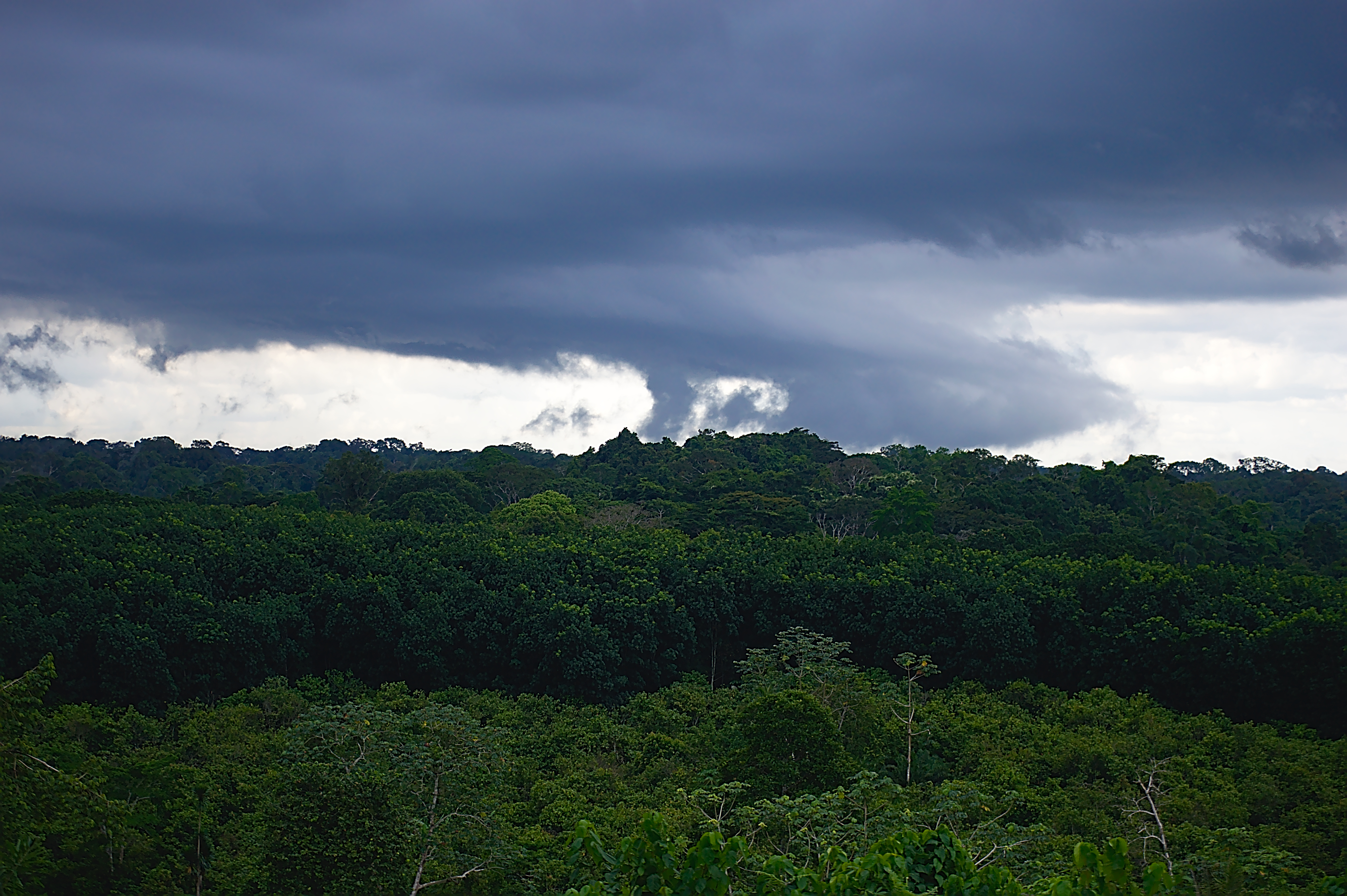
Ankasa Conservation

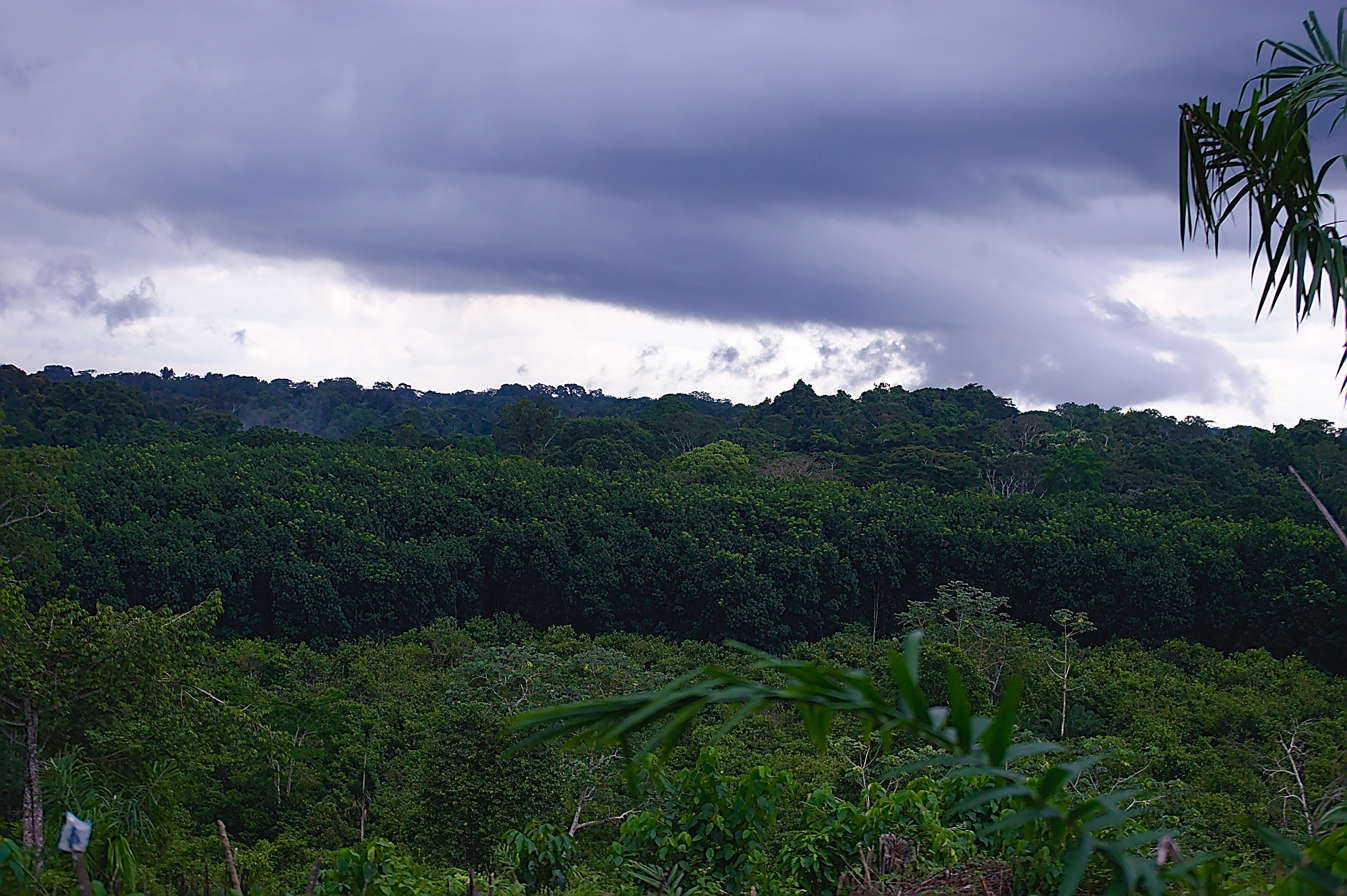
:Ankasa Conservation

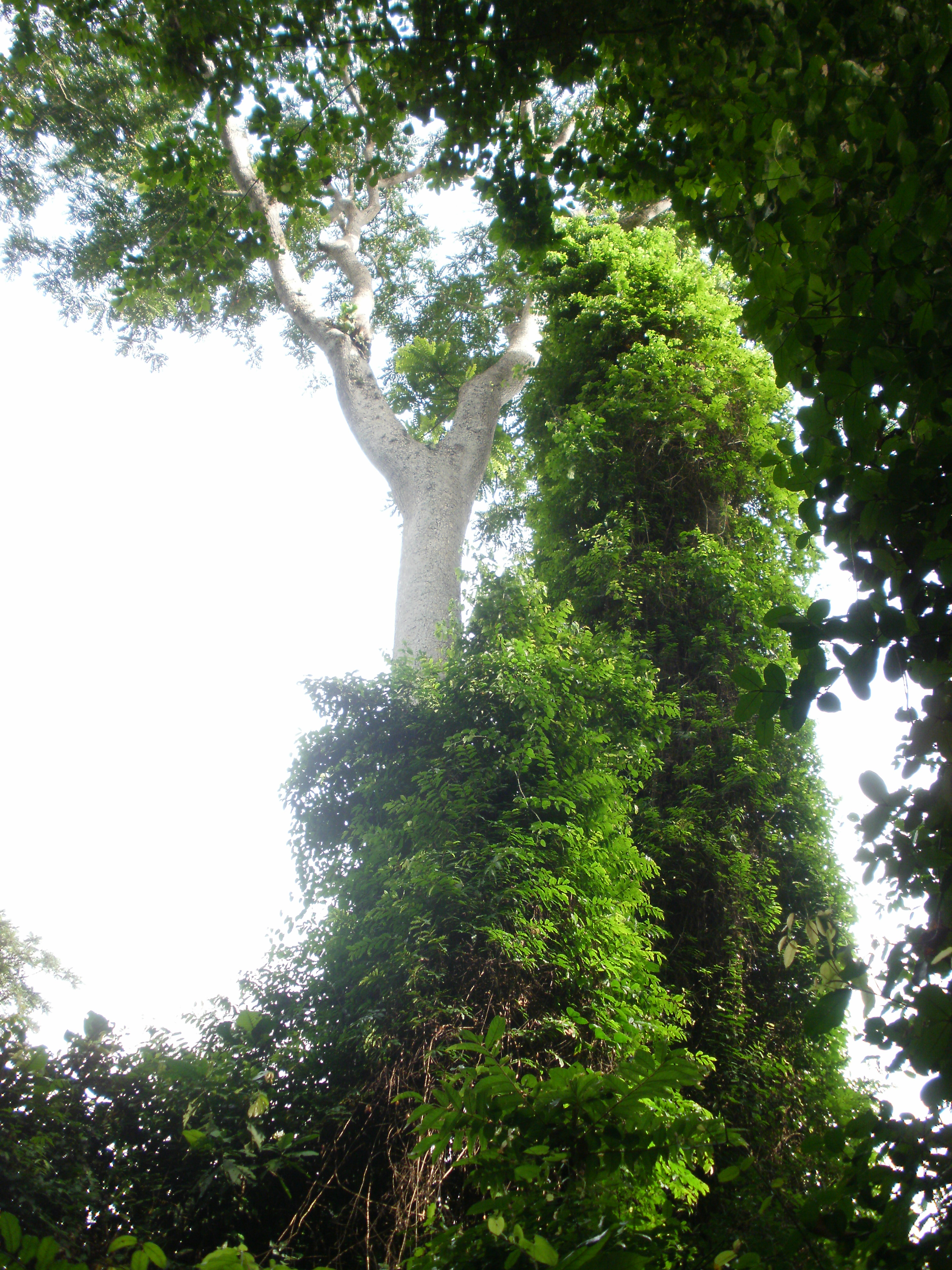
Climbers at the Ankasa Conservation

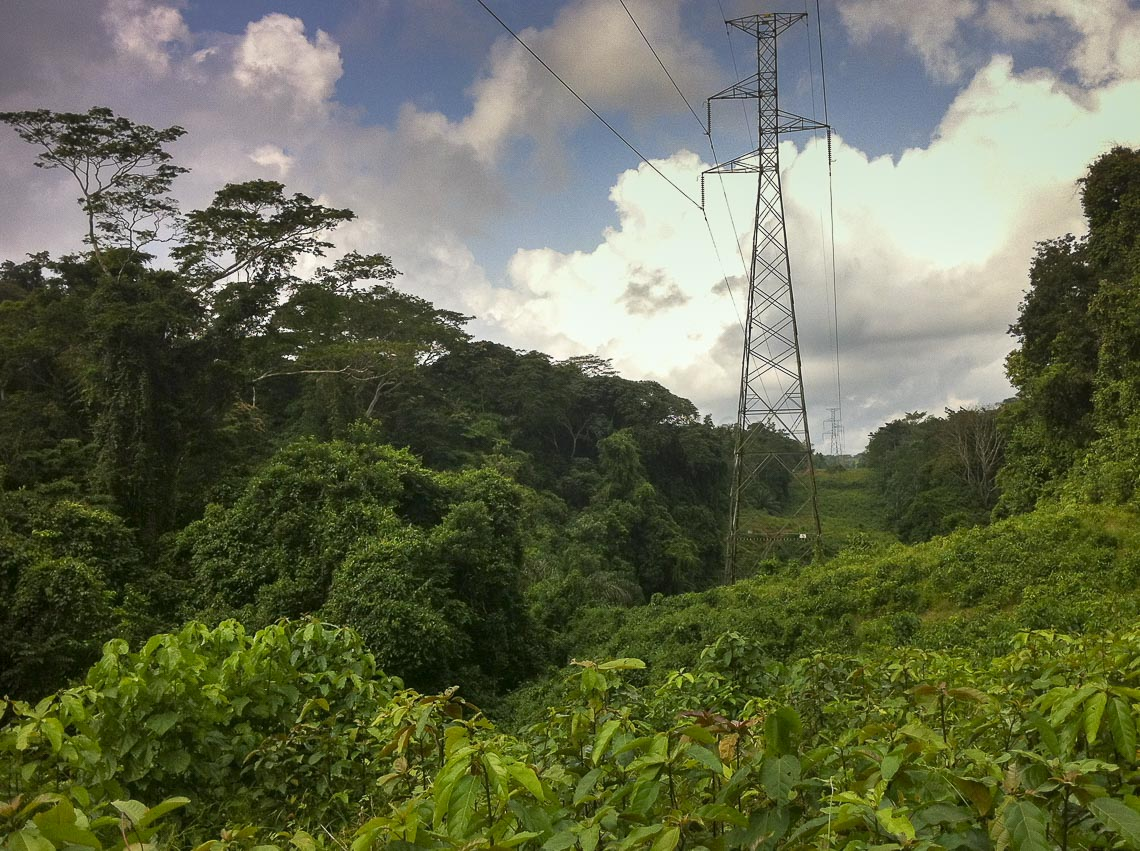
Electricity pylons - Ankasa Conservation Area, Ghana

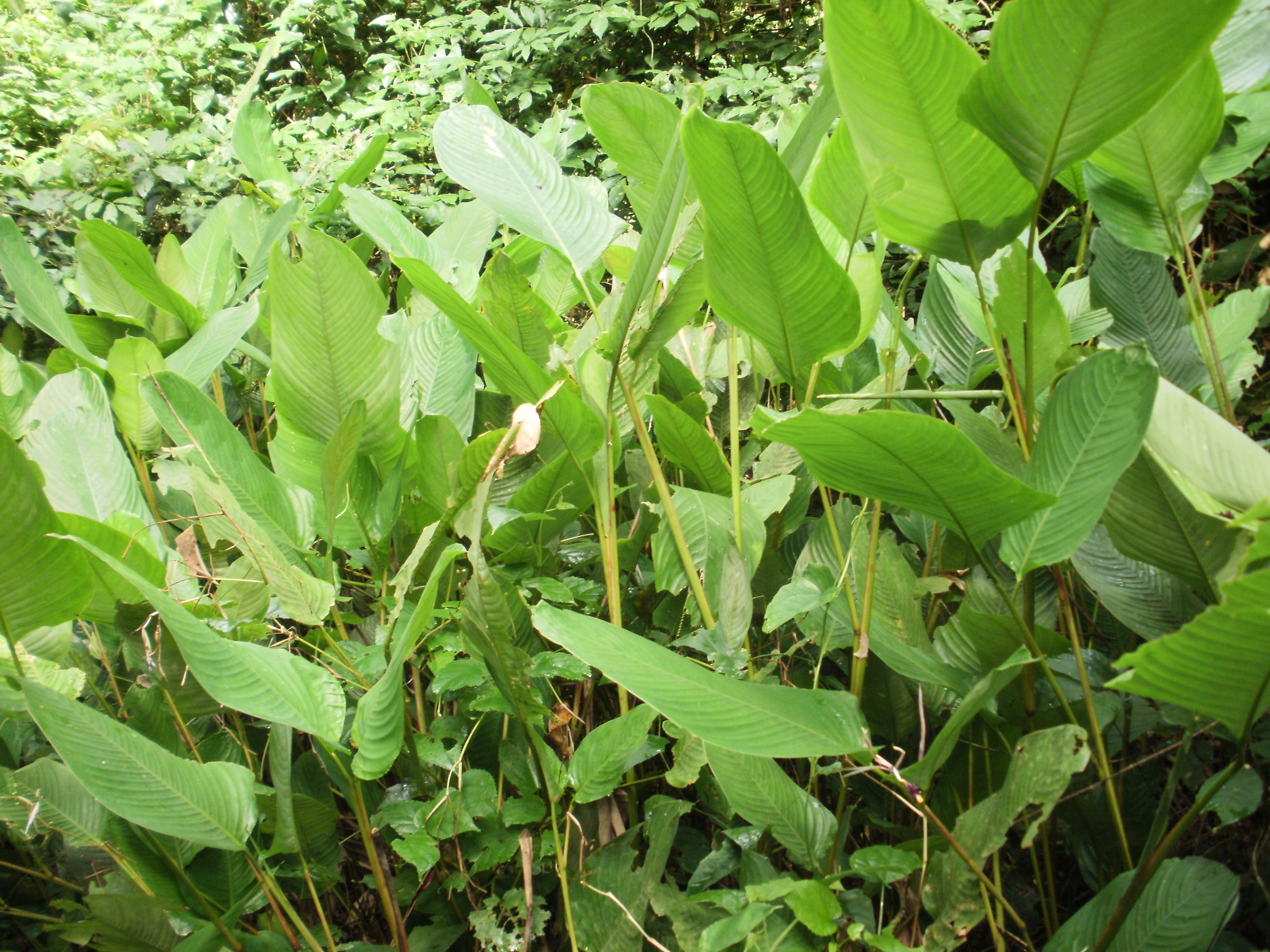
Shrubs in Ankasa rain forest, Ghana
