= Ninnis =

Ninnis may refer to:

- Ninnis Glacier
  - Mertz-Ninnis Valley
- Belgrave Edward Sutton Ninnis (1887–1912), British Army officer and Antarctic explorer
- Belgrave Ninnis (1837–1922), Royal Navy surgeon, pioneer of Northern Australia, surveyor, Arctic explorer, and Freemason
- Scott Ninnis (born 1965), Australian basketball player

== See also ==
- Ninni, a given name
