= Simat-Ištaran =

Simat-Ištaran (also Šāt-Eštar; fl. c. 2050 BC) was a daughter of a king of Ur at the end of the third millennium BC. It is uncertain exactly which 3rd Dynasty of Ur ruler was her father though Shulgi, Shu-Sin, and even Amar-Sin have been suggested. Simat-Ištaran is mainly known from cuneiform texts coming from Garšana. According to those texts. she was married to the general and physician Ŝu-Kabta. This connection is never explicitly mentioned within the texts, but can be inferred. This marriage documents how the kings of the 3rd Dynasty of Ur married family members to various important people in the country. After the death of her husband, Simat-Ištaran inherited his estate and continued to manage it alone.
