= Umma =

Ancient Sumerian city in modern-day Iraq

- Location within Iraq
- 31°40′02″N 45°53′15″E
- Type: Settlement
- Location: Dhi Qar Province, Iraq
- Region: Mesopotamia

Site notes
- Excavation dates: 1854, 1885, 1999–2002, 2017–2019
- Archaeologists: William Loftus, John Punnett Peters, Nawala Ahmed Al-Mutawalli, Drahoslav Hulínek

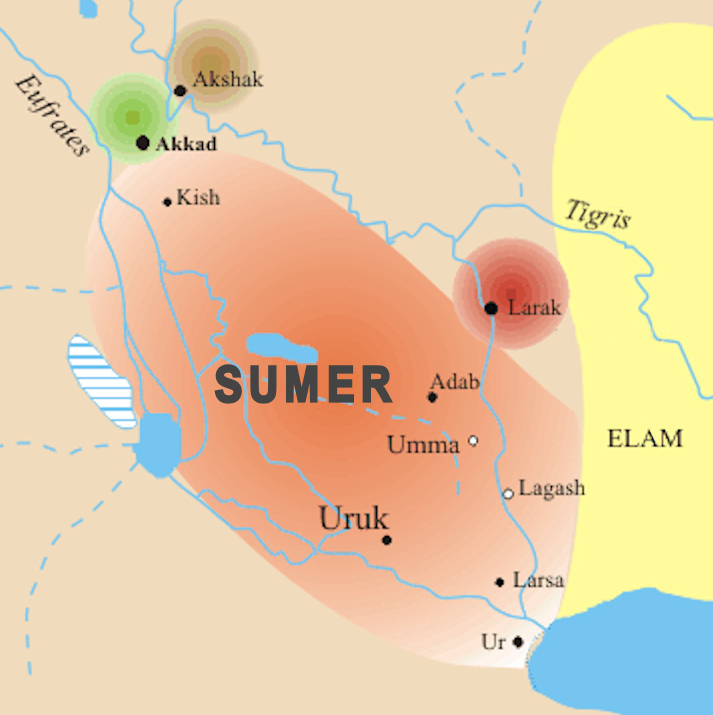
Location of the city of Umma in Sumer

Umma (Sumerian: 𒄑𒆵𒆠 = GIŠ.KUŠU_{2}^{KI}) in modern Dhi Qar Province in Iraq, was an ancient city in Sumer. There is some scholarly debate about the Sumerian and Akkadian names for this site. Traditionally, Umma was identified with Tell Jokha. More recently it has been suggested that it was located at Umm al-Aqarib, less than 7 km (4.3 mi) to its northwest or was even the name of both cities. One or both were the leading city of the Early Dynastic kingdom of Gišša, with the most recent excavators putting forth that Umm al-Aqarib was prominent in EDIII but Jokha rose to preeminence later. The town of KI.AN was also nearby. KI.AN, which was destroyed by Rimush, a ruler of the Akkadian Empire. There are known to have been six gods of KI.AN including Gula KI.AN and Sara KI.AN.

The tutelary gods of Umma were Sara and Ninura. It is known that the ED ruler Ur-Lumma built a temple to the god Enki-gal and one to the god Nagar-pa'e at Umma.

In the early Sumerian literary composition Inanna's Descent into the Underworld, Inanna dissuades demons from the netherworld from taking Shara, patron of Umma, who was living in squalor.

== History ==
The site was occupied at least as far back as the Uruk period. A number of proto-cuneiform came from there. While most early textual sources are from Early Dynastic III, a few tablets and a plaque from ED I/II came from there.

=== Early Dynastic period ===
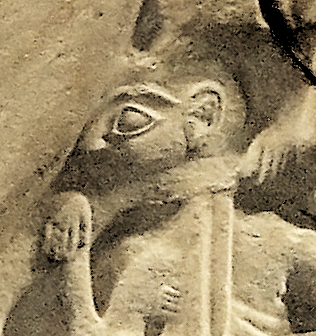
Imprisoned man of Umma on the Stele of the Vultures

Because the two sites were not excavated until modern times, earlier archaeologists, based on the many looted texts available to them, grouped together the ancient cities during the Early Dynastic (ED) period of Gišša and Umma into the single geographic name of Umma. Modern excavation at these sites has clarified that. Gišša ceased occupation after the ED and only one ruler is known, based on a lapis lazuli bead reading "To the goddess Inanna, Aka, king of Gišša (dedicated this bead)".

Best known for its long frontier conflict with Lagash, as reported c. 2400 BC by Entemena, the city reached its zenith c. 2350 BC, under the rule of Lugal-Zage-Si who also controlled Ur and Uruk.

=== Sargonic period ===
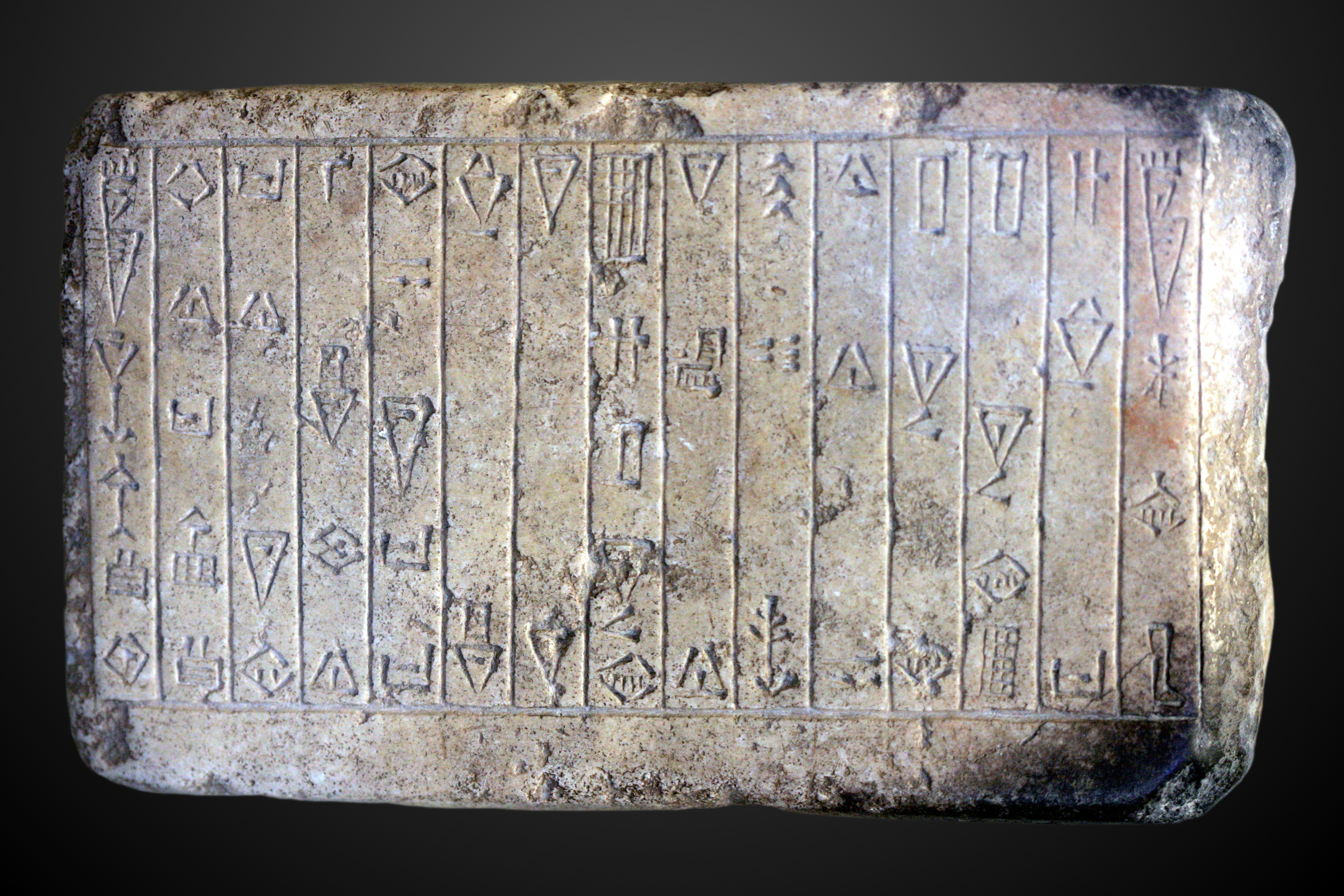
An Early Dynastic inscription of Lugalannatum from Umma (Collection of the Louvre Museum)

Under the Akkadian Empire Umma was a major power and economic center rivaled only by Adab and Uruk. Eleven governors under Akkad are known as well as two who may have been under Gutium. One, Lu-Utu, reports building a temple for Ninhursag and another for Ereshkigal. Namahni, a governor from the time of Iarlagan of Gutium, records building the E-ula temple of Ninura. The Sargonic period ruler of Umma Lugalanatum built the temple E-gidru there.

"Lugalannatum prince of Umma... built the E.GIDRU [Sceptre] Temple at Umma, buried his foundation deposit [and] regulated the orders. At that time, Si'um was king of Gutium."

A cuneiform text lays out the adjudication of a boundary dispute between Adab and Umma by Naram-Sin of Akkad (c. 2255–2218 BC). It lists the governor under Akkad of Umma as Šubur-Nagarpae and the governor of Adab as Lugal-ša. This is the first attestation of both. The decision was witnessed by the "city elders" of Adab, Tallani, Ibrat, and Pašime.

=== Ur III period ===
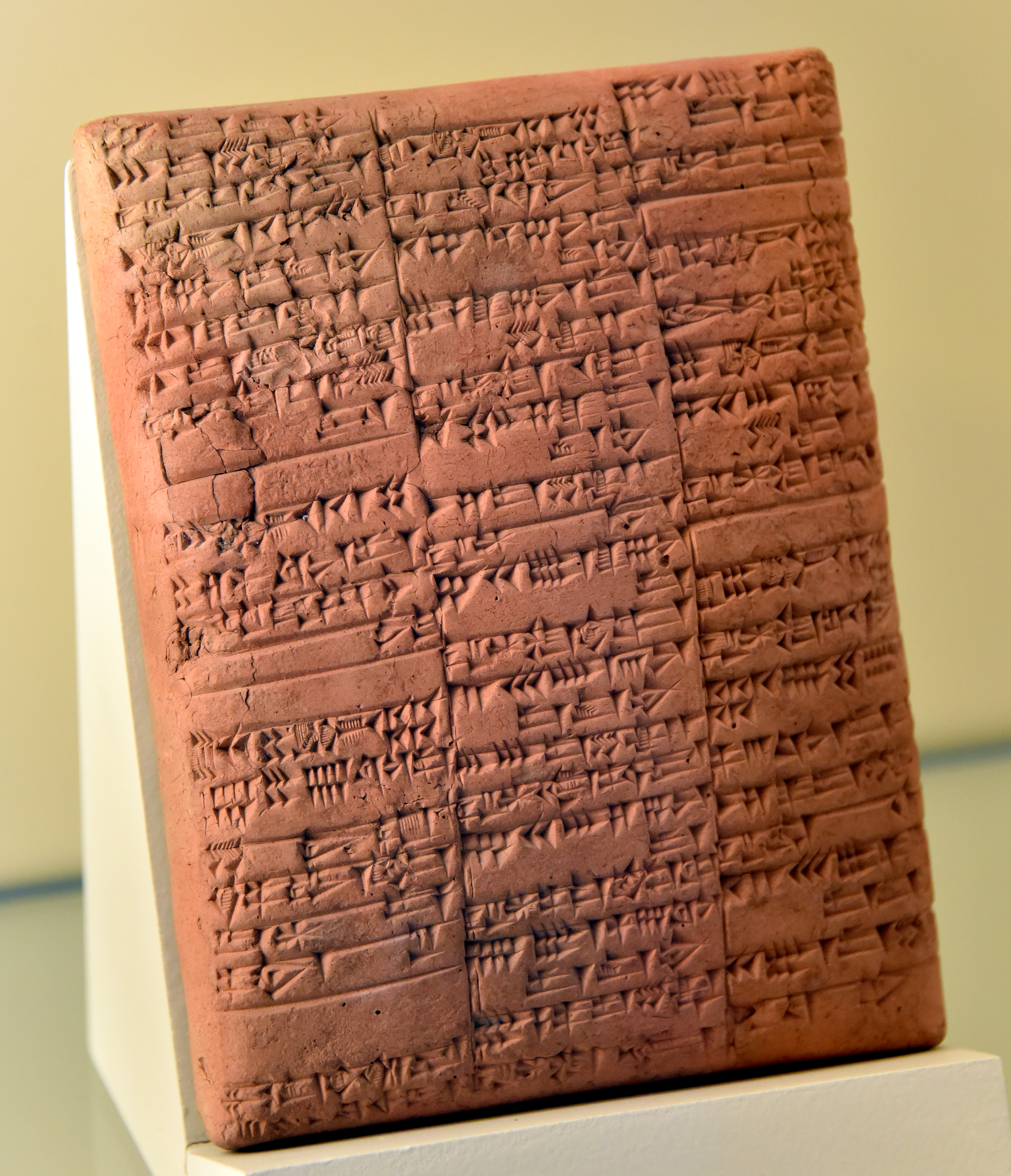
Clay tablet. Delivery certificate. Reign of Shu-Sin of Ur, 21st century BCE. From Umma, Iraq. Vorderasiatisches Museum, Berlin.

Under the Ur III dynasty, Umma became an important provincial center. The Ur III Umma province consisted of four districts, Da-Umma, Apisal, Gu’edena, and Mušbiana. It is known from archive that the economy of Umma was about 1/3 the size of nearby Lagash province. Several governors of Umma under Ur are known, Aa-kala, Dadaga, and Ur-Lisi, all sons of one Ur-Nigar, and Ninbilia, wife of Aa-kala. Most of the over 30,000 tablets recovered from the site are administrative and economic texts from that time. They permit an excellent insight into affairs in Umma. A year name of Ur III ruler Shu-Sin was "Year Shu-Sin the king of Ur built the temple of Shara in Umma". The next ruler Ibbi-Sin also had a year name of "Year Ibbi-Sin the king of Ur built the temple of Shara in Umma". The Umma calendar of Shulgi (c. 21st century BC) is the immediate predecessor of the later Babylonian calendar, and indirectly of the post-exilic Hebrew calendar.

In the following Isin-Larsa period, a ruler of Larsa, Sumuel (c. 1894-1866 BC), lists as one of his later year names "Year Umma was destroyed".

== Archaeology ==
=== Tell Jokha ===
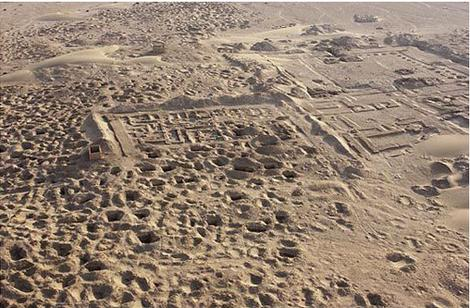
Aerial view of Umma

Also called Tell Djokha and Tell Yokha. The site of Tell Jokha was visited by William Loftus in 1854 and John Punnett Peters of the University of Pennsylvania in 1885. Peters found it to be half covered with sand dunes and found fragments of worked stone and copper fragments. In the early 1900s, many illegally excavated Umma tablets began to appear on the antiquities market. Many of these tablets used an unusual "mul-iti" dating system (year x, month y, day z) from the reigns of Akkadian Empire rulers Naram-Sin and Shar-kali-shari. From 1999 to 2002 Jokha, already heavily looted, was worked by an Iraqi team led by Nawala Ahmed Al-Mutawalli, recovering a number of tablets and bullae from the Early Dynastic, Sargonic, Ur III, and Old Babylonian periods as well as an Ur III period temple and Old Babylonian residences. The cuneiform tablets are in the process of being published.

On the northern end of the main mound the Ešagepadda temple of Shara (Šara), primary deity of Umma, was found. Preparations for the temple construction began in the last year of Amar-Sin and the temple was finished in the 8th year of Shu-Sin. It is known that a "Ešagepada of Umma (ĜIŠ.KUŠU₂ki)" existed in the early Akkadian Empire period though no trace has been found. The large mudbrick temple was 90 meters by 130 meters with a 6 meter thick exterior wall. The exterior wall had buttresses, recesses, and two entrances. The main temple courtyard measured 42 meters by 30 meters. Artifacts found dated primarily to the Ur III and the Early Old Babylonian periods with a few from the Akkadian period. The temple was the findspot for all cuneiform tablets and bullae. A number of door sockets were found, some in situ.

The site was visited around 1900 by archaeologist Walter Andrae who described the site as being 1000 meters long and 15 meters high with a small plateau to the north holding the remains of a 70 meter by 70 meter building, The site was visited during a regional archaeological survey in 1967. The site was estimated to cover an area 150 meters in diameter. A surface survey showed "Late Early Dynastic and Old Babylonian are dominant in surface collections, but intervening Akkadian, Ur III, and Larsa periods also are well represented".

In 2016, a team from the Slovak Archaeological and Historical Institute led by Drahoslav Hulínek began excavations at Tell Jokha focusing on the Temple of Shara. A trench (Trench 1) excavated in 2016 showed the temple had two construction phases (Level 3 and 4). Level 4 is thought to date from the Old Akkadian period. In 2017 a square at the top (Trench 2) of the tell was opened, amidst numerous looter holes, and at Level 5 found Early Dynastic construction. In 2019 and 2020 eighteen cuneiform tablets from the Old Babylonian, Ur III, Old Akkadian and Early Dynastic periods were found in Trench 2, three in situ. A topographic survey showed that in the Early Dynastic period Umma reached an area of 400 hectares, with a 40 hectare city center.

=== Umm al-Aqarib (Gišša) ===
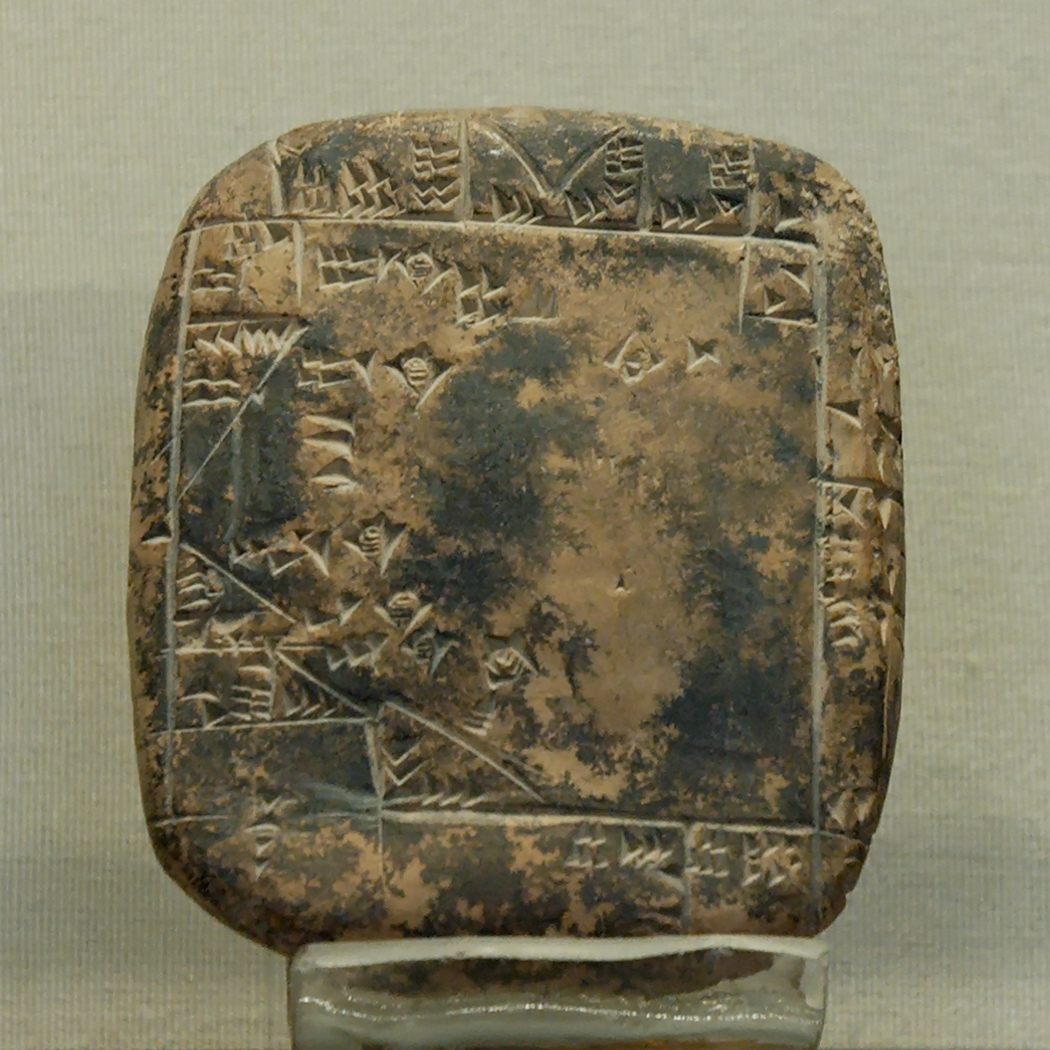
Map of a property belonging to the city of Ur III Umma, indicating the acreage of each parcel

The site of Umm al-Aqarib (located at 45.80°E longitude and 31.60°N latitude) lies about 6 kilometers southeast of Tell Jokha, covers about 5 square kilometers and is made up of 21 mounds the largest of which is 20 meters above the level of the plain. It is thought to be the ancient city of Gišša and was abandoned after the Early Dynastic period. The location was first visited by John Punnett Peters in the late 1800s, finding it relatively free from sand and featuring two prominent elevations of baked bricks set with bitumen. It was excavated for a total of 7 seasons in 1999–2002 (led by Donny George Youkhanna and Haider A. Urebi) and 2008–2010 (led by Taha Kerim Abod) under difficult conditions. Excavation was triggered by widespread looting at the site. Looting has continued. At Umm al-Aqarib, archaeologists uncovered levels from the Early Dynastic Period (c. 2900–2300 BC), including residences, palaces, and several monumental buildings, including two Early Dynastic temples (the White Temple and Temple H). About 70 "cuneiform sources" were also excavated. The tutelary god is thought to be Ama-ušumgal-ana. Uruk period clay cone mosaics have also been found at the site.

=== Tell Shmet ===
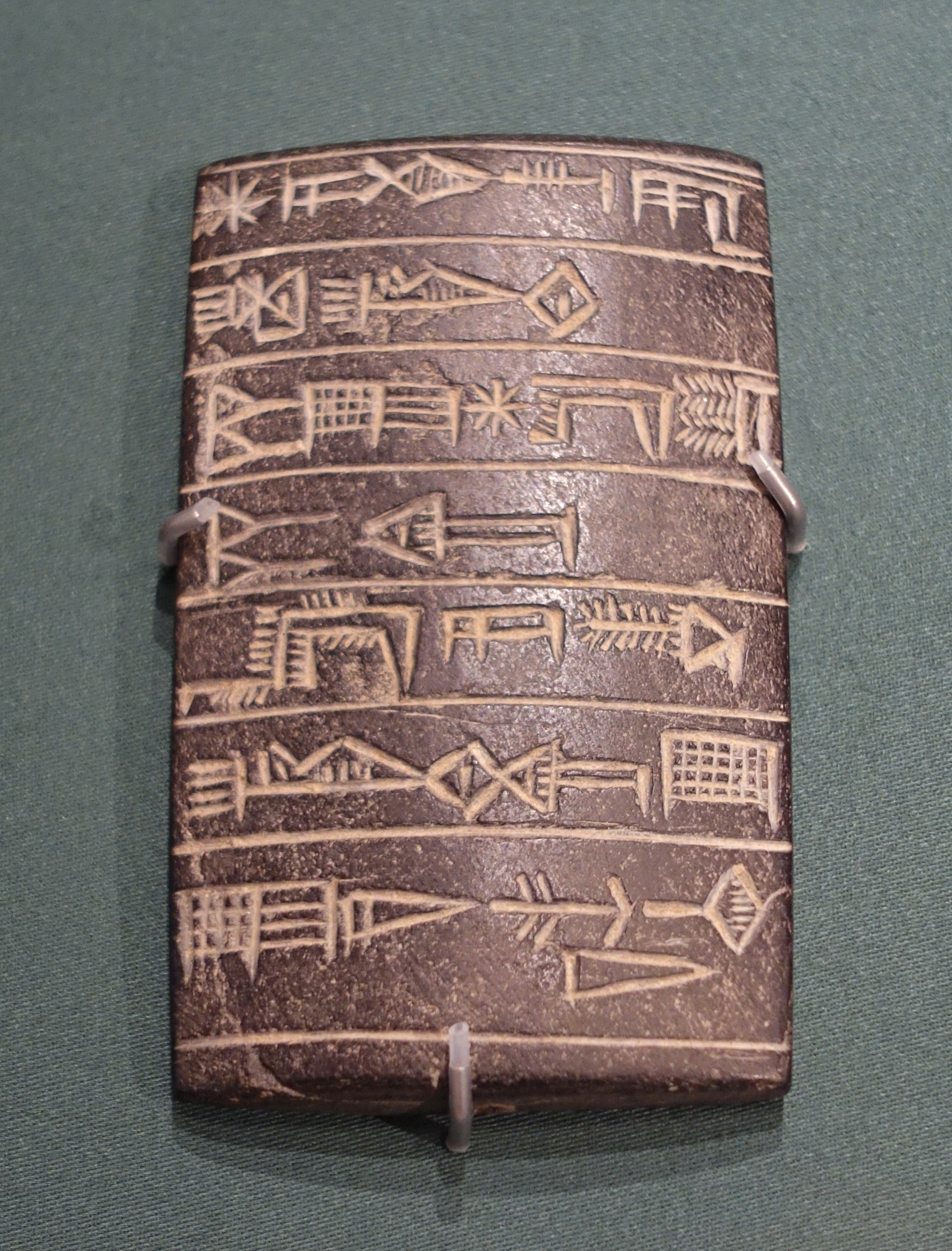
Stone tablet re Il, king of Umma, c. 2400 BC "For ..., Il, king of Umma, son of Eandamu, grandson of Enakale king of Umma, built his/her temple"

The site of Tell Shmet (also Tell Schmidt and Tell Shmid) also lies nearby, around 10 kilometers to the northwest of Umma and within visual distance of Zabala 4 kilometers to the east. It is on the banks of the eastern branch of the Euphrates river just above the canal leading to Zabala. It was part of the Umma province in the Ur III period. The site measures 990 by 720 meters (712,800 square meters). The site was examined during a regional archaeological survey in 1967 (as site WS 168) and determined to have been occupied from the Late Uruk period () based on Uruk period clay cone mosaics), the Early Dynastic period, and to a lesser extent in the Akkadian period. The main Sargonic and Ur III remains of the site were destroyed by a Ministry of Agriculture program to plant trees so as to prevent sand dunes. In response to looting which began in 1994 the Iraqi State Board of Antiquities and Heritage conducted salvage excavations in 2001 and 2002 under Mohammad Sabri Abdulraheem. All of the paper records of the excavation were lost in looting of residential areas after the 2003 war. Plano-convex bricks and a residential area of the Early Dynastic III and Akkadian periods were uncovered. Finds included 67 clay cuneiform tablets, dozens of cylinder seals, and a number of stone and metal objects. The tablets mostly date ED III with the latest being Ur III. The tablets support the proposal that the ancient name of the site was Ki.an^{ki}. They mention the names of the gods Ninazu and Dumuzi-Maru. Only six of the tablets have been published.

Previous textual analysis had indicated that KI.AN was very near to Zabala. During the reign of Rimush, second ruler of the Akkadian Empire, KI.AN, under its governor Lugal-KA, joined a regional revolt and was defeated. In the Ur III period KI.AN had an ensi (governor). In that period it is known to have had a temple to the deified ruler Shulgi (called "e-^{d}Sulgi-ra") as well as temples to the gods Šara, Ninurra, Amarsuena, Geštinanna, Dumuzi, Gula, Ninlagaša, and Nine'e.

=== Looting ===
During the 2003 invasion of Iraq, looters descended upon the sites of Tell Jokha and Tell Umm al-Aqarib which are now pockmarked with hundreds of ditches and pits. The prospects for future official excavation and research were seriously compromised in the process. In 2011, Global Heritage Network, which monitors threats to cultural heritage sites in developing nations, released aerial images comparing Umma in 2003 and 2010, showing a landscape devastated by looters' trenches during that time—approximately 1.12 square km in total. Confiscated Umma area cuneiform tablets continue to make their way to the Museum of Iraq, including a group of 1500 in 2009.

== List of rulers ==
Although the first dynasty of Umma has become well-known based on mentions in inscriptions contemporaneous with other dynasties from the Early Dynastic (ED) III period; it was not inscribed onto the Sumerian King List (SKL). The first dynasty of Umma preceded the dynasty of Akkad in a time in which Umma exercised considerable influence in the region. Only a single ruler (Lugal-zage-si) from Umma was named on the SKL; however, his name appears as the sole ruler for the third dynasty of Uruk. The following list should not be considered complete:

Portrait or inscription	Ruler	Approx. date and length of reign (Middle Chronology)	Comments, notes, and references for mentions
Early Dynastic II period (c. 2700 – c. 2600 BC)
Predynastic Umma (c. 2900 – c. 2500 BC)
	(Akinana)	Uncertain; this ruler may have fl. c. 2900 – c. 2600 BC sometime during the Early Dynastic (ED) period	Historicity certain; Same person as Aga (?)
Early Dynastic IIIa period (c. 2600 – c. 2500 BC)
	(Parasagnudi) 𒉺𒉈𒅍𒃲𒌇	Uncertain; these two rulers may have fl. c. 2600 – c. 2500 BC sometime during the ED IIIa period	Historicity certain; temp. of Ur-Pabilsag
	(Eabzu)	Uncertain; these two rulers may have fl. c. 2600 – c. 2500 BC sometime during the ED IIIa period	Historicity certain; temp. of Meskiagnun
Portrait or inscription	Ruler	Approx. date and length of reign (MC)	Comments, notes, and references for mentions
Early Dynastic IIIb period (c. 2500 – c. 2350 BC)
First dynasty of Umma / Umma I dynasty (c. 2500 – c. 2230 BC)
	Pabilgagaltuku 𒉺𒉈𒅍𒃲𒌇	r. c. 2500 BC	Historicity certain; Held the title of, "Governor of Umma"; temp. of Ur-Nanshe
	Ush ("Ninta") 𒍑	r. c. 2455 BC	Historicity certain; Held the title of, "Governor of Umma"; temp. of Akurgal
	Enakalle 𒂗𒀉𒆗𒇷	r. c. 2445 BC (8 years)	Historicity certain; Held the title of, "Governor of Umma"; temp. of Eannatum
	Ur-Lumma 𒌨𒀭𒈝𒂷	r. c. 2425 BC (12 years)	Son of Enakalle; Held the title of, "Governor of Umma"; temp. of Enannatum I
	Il 𒅍	r. c. 2420 BC (15 years)	Cousin of Ur-Lumma; Held the title of, "King of Umma"; temp. of Entemena
	Gishakidu 𒄑𒊮𒆠𒄭	r. c. 2400 BC (5 years)	Son of Il; temp. of Enannatum II
	Me'annedu	Uncertain (29 years)	
	Ushurdu	Uncertain (9 years)	temp. of Enentarzi
	Edin	Uncertain (6 years)	temp. of Lugalanda
	Ukush 𒌑𒌑	r. c. 2350 BC	temp. of Urukagina
Proto-Imperial period (c. 2350 – c. 2230 BC)
	Lugal-zage-si 𒈗𒍠𒄀𒋛	r. c. 2340 BC (8 years)	Son of Ukush; temp. of Enshakushanna
	Mese	r. c. 2330 BC	temp. of Ur-Zababa
	Ennalum	Uncertain (6 years)	temp. of Ikun-Shamash
	Shurushken	Uncertain	temp. of Sargon
Portrait or inscription	Ruler	Approx. date and length of reign (MC)	Comments, notes, and references for mentions
Gutian period (c. 2230 – c. 2112 BC)
Second dynasty of Umma / Umma II dynasty (c. 2230 – c. 1866 BC)
	Lugalannatum 𒈗𒀭𒈾𒁺	r. c. 2130 BC	temp. of Si'um; Vassal to the Gutian dynasty
Ur III period (c. 2112 – c. 2004 BC)
	Ur-Nigar	r. c. 2061 BC	Son of Girini (?); temp. of Shulgi
	Ur-Lisi	r. c. 2038 BC (23 years)	Son of Ur-Nigar
	Aa-kala	r. c. 2029 BC (9 years)	Brother of Ur-Lisi
	Dadaga	r. c. 2022 BC (7 years)	Brother of Ayakalla
	Ur-E'e	Uncertain	Brother of Dadaga
	Lu-Haya	Uncertain	Son of Ur-E'e

== Gallery ==
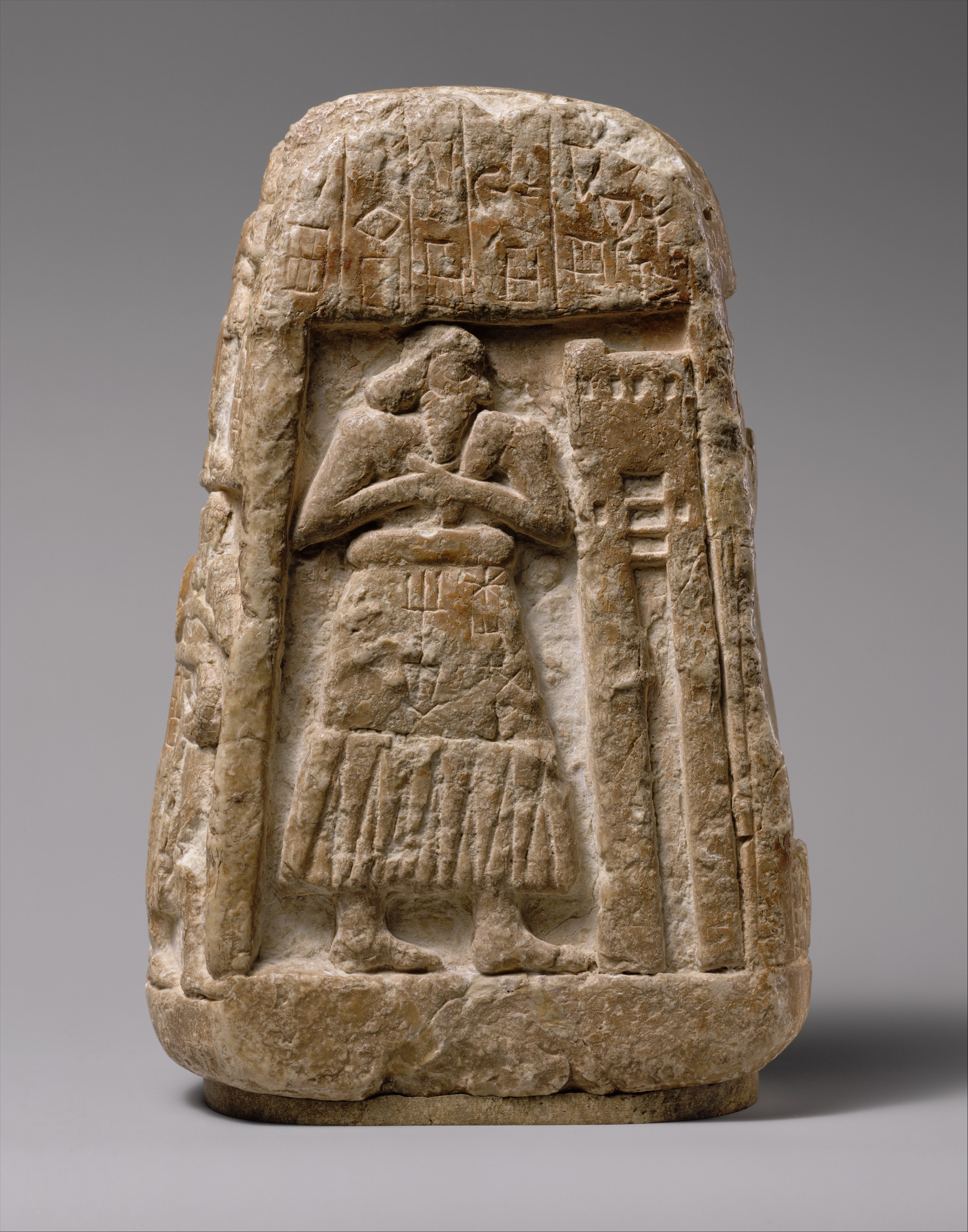
Stele of Ushumgal, 2900-2700 BC. Probably from Umma.

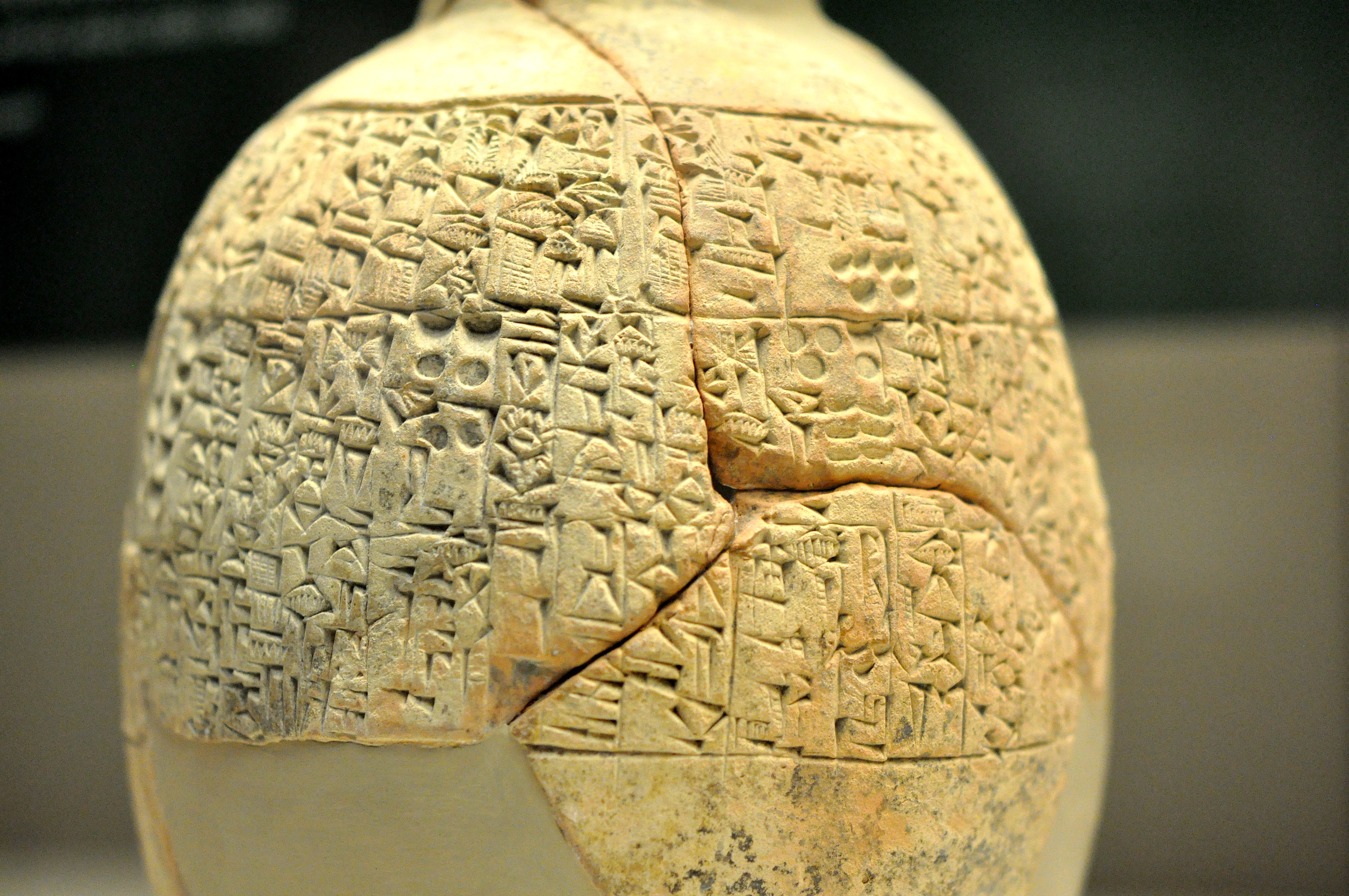
Vase of King Gishakidu, king of Umma, and son of Ur-Lumma. This cuneiform text gives the city of Umma's account of its long-running border dispute with Lagash. c. 2350 BC. From Umma, Iraq. The British Museum, London.

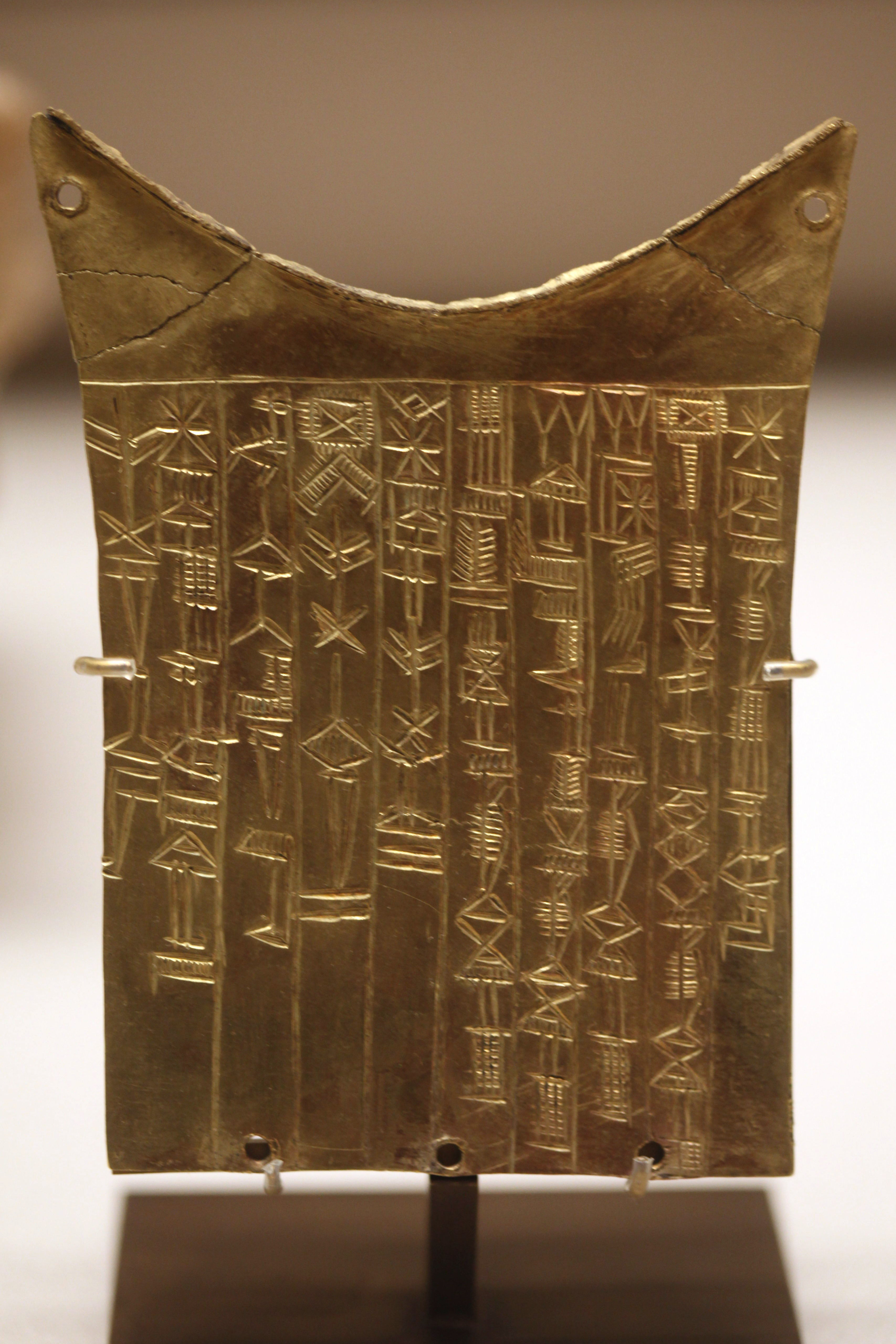
Votive plaque offered by Bara-irnun, queen of Umma, to God Šara in gratitude for sparing her life. Date c. 2370 BC.

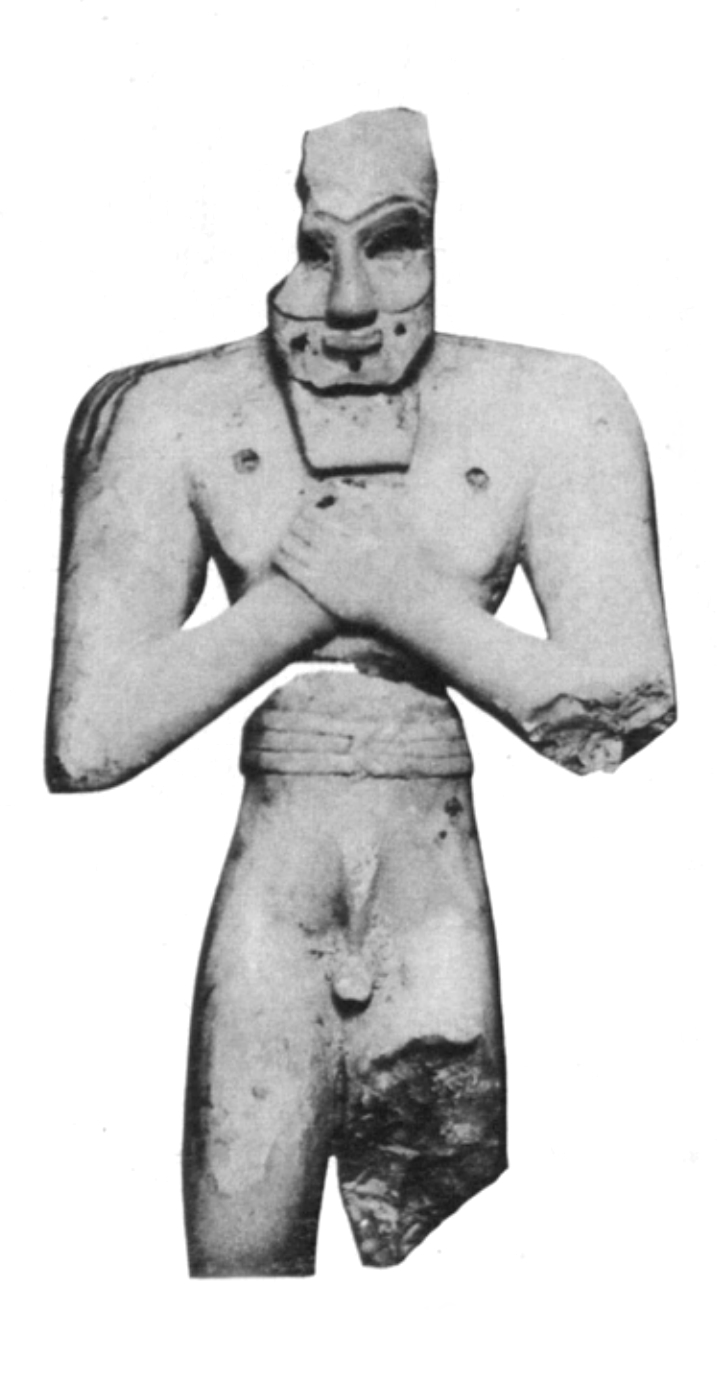
Alabaster ithyphallic statue from Umma, from an Early Dynastic temple. Baghdad Museum
An official of Umma, c. 2400 BC
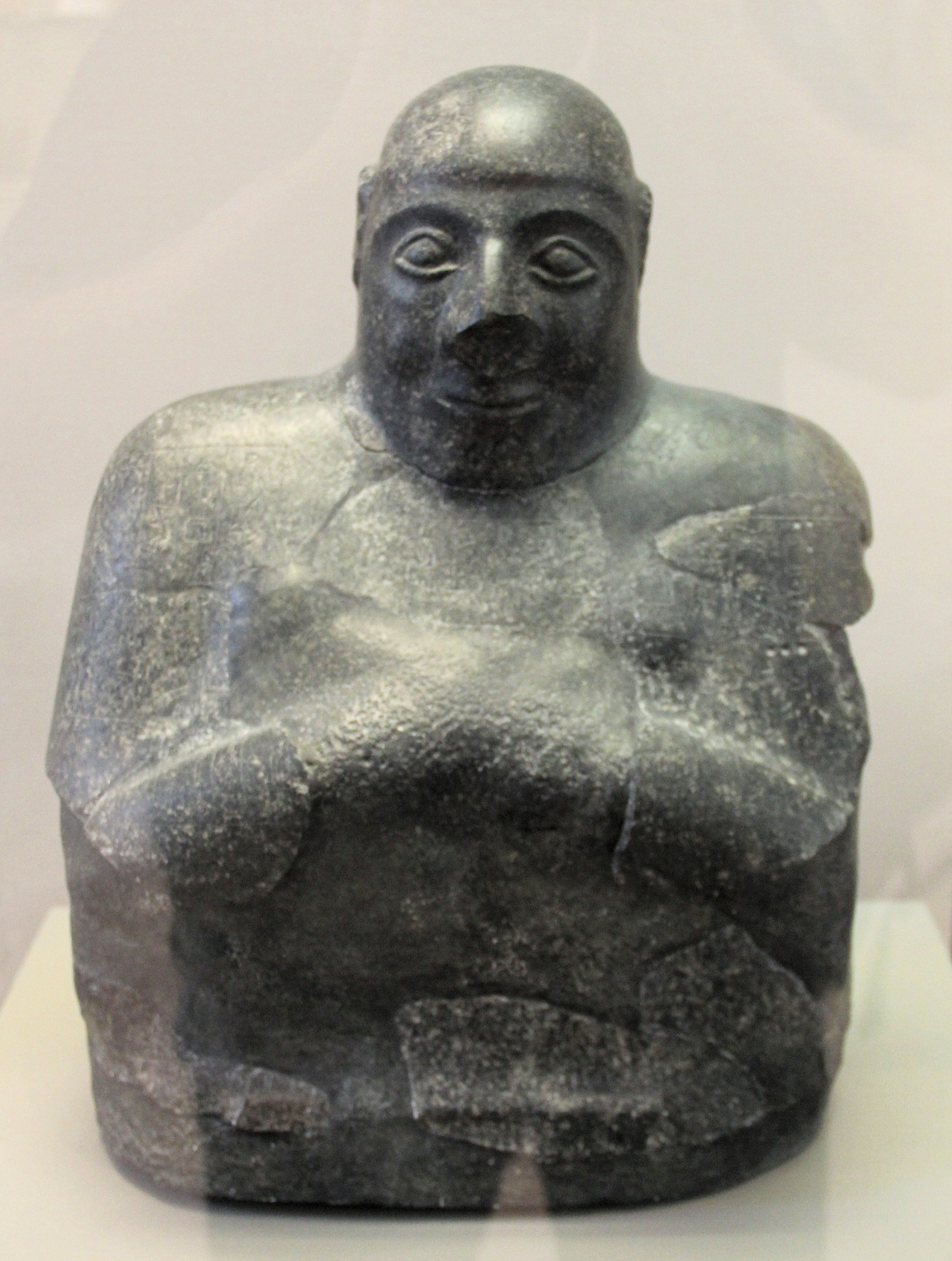
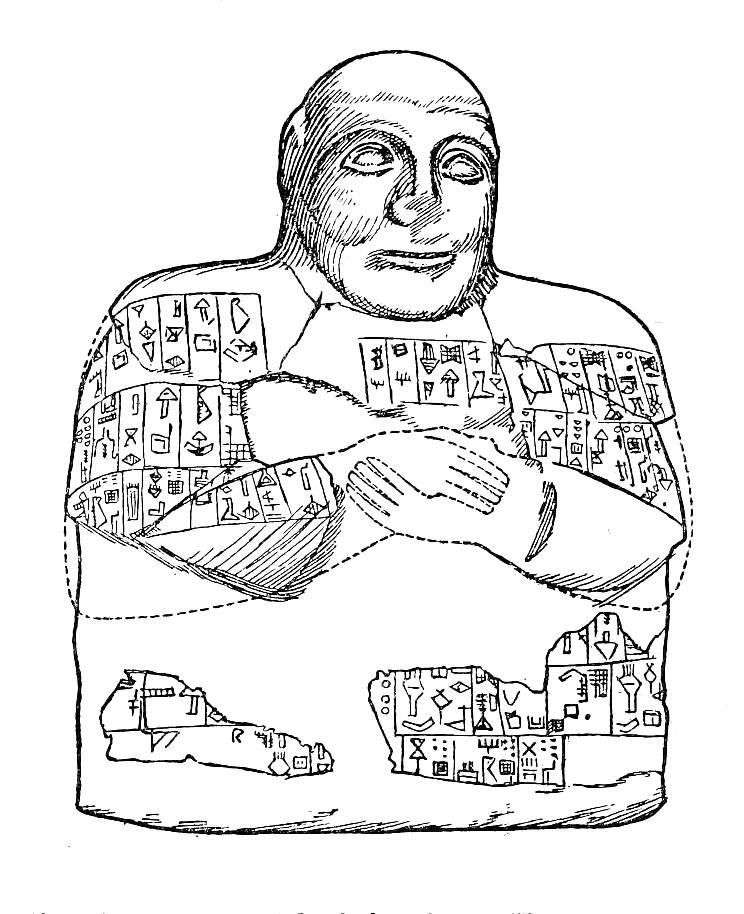
Diorite statue of Lupad, an official of the city of Umma, with inscriptions recording the purchase of land in Lagash. Early Dynastic Period III, c. 2400 BC.

== See also ==
- Apišal
- Cities of the Ancient Near East
- Garšana
- List of Mesopotamian dynasties
