= Ninni =

Ninni is a given name and nickname. Notable people with the name include:

== Given name ==
- Ninni Kronberg (1874–1946), Swedish inventor
- Ninni Holmqvist (born 1958), Swedish novelist and translator
- Ninni Laaksonen (born 1986), Finnish model, beauty pageant titleholder, and businessperson

== Surname ==
- Alessandro Pericle Ninni (1837–1892), Italian zoologist

== Nickname ==
- Ninni Bruschetta (born Antonino Bruschetta in 1962), Italian actor, director, and screenwriter
- Ninni Cassarà, nickname of Antonino Cassarà (1947–1985), Italian magistrate
- Ninni (Sholay), a fictional character in the 1975 classic Indian film Sholay

== See also ==
- Nini (disambiguation)
- Ninnis (disambiguation)
- Inanna
