= Garšana =

Ancient Mesopotamian city

Garšana (also Garshana and GARšana) was a city in the ancient Near East which is still unlocated. A proposed reading of the toponym is "Nig_{2}-ša(-an)-na^{ki}". It was also referred to as "Uṣar-GARšana" indicating it was a newly built town. It is primarily known from the late 3rd millennium BC during the time of the Ur III empire. It is known to have been sited in the Umma province though was under direct royal control by Ur III rulers and had close relations with the unlocated ancient city of Iri-Saĝrig. Unlike Iri-Saĝrig it was not the seat of a governor and hosted no royal guests so less records are available. Though the city has not yet been found a number of cuneiform tablets have appeared on the antiquities market which have enabled important insights into everyday life in that period. There is some indication that there was a military camp with the same name adjacent to the town of Garšana.

== History ==
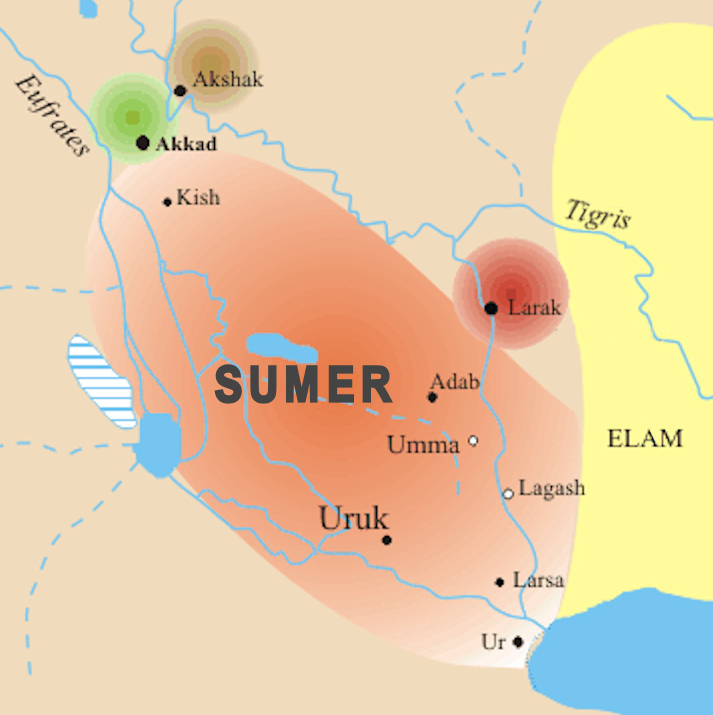
Map showing location of Umma

All the current sources from Garšana come from the period of the Ur III empire. It was one of at least 20 royal settlements in the Umma province including Zabalam, Karkar, and NAGsu, of which Garšana was the largest. Contemporary texts indicate that the city had 1,347 royal settlers (heads of household) for a total population of about 5,000. There were also a number of slaves present, including 175 in the household of Šu-Kabta. It was governed by a general (šagina), some colonels (nu-bànda), a mayor (hazannu), and a council of elders. In the final years of Shulgi the general was named Arad-Nanna (Aradmu) and in Amar-Sin's 5th year the mayor is known to have been one Lušallim. The city had two "households of Nergal" with ereÍ-dingir and egi-zi priestesses though it is not clear that a shrine to Nergal existed at Garšana. It is known that elūnum rites for Nergal took place there. A daughter of an Ur III ruler (Shulgi, Shu-Sin, or Amar-Sin), Simat-Ištaran (also Me-Ištaran or Šāt-Eštar), lived on a royal estate at Garšana with her doctor/general husband Šu-Kabta (son of Naram-ili) who was in charge of Garšana. Šu-Kabta, who is known to have had a larger residence in Nippur, died in the year Shu-Sin 8 and his wife, Simat-Ištaran, subsequently took over that role. The names of two other doctors located at Garšana were Nawir-ilum and Ubārtum (sister of Šu-Kabta). It is known that Princess Šeleppūtum owned orchard land in Garšana.

After the Ur III period there was a single mention of Garšana in a text from the 19th year of Ishbi-Erra (c. 2000 BC), founder of the Dynasty of Isin which immediately followed Ur. In the Old Babylonian period there is known to have been a town named Uzargarsana in the neighborhood of Erech. Uncertain if that is the same city as Garšana. A Arad-Nanna is known to have held the title "general of Uṣar-Garšana" in the time of ruler Su-Suen.

== Sources ==
Although Garšana has yet to be found, beginning in 1999 a large number of Sumerian language (with occasional Akkadian language elements) cuneiform tablets have become available via the antiquities market, having been looted from the site. Most of the personal names in the texts are Akkadian vs Sumerian. Most tablets are datable as they are marked with the year names of Ur III rulers, mostly the later years of Shu-Sin and early years of Ibbi-Suen (c. 2030 BC). Other can be dated by context. About 1500 of the tablets are from a single archive and stem from Shu-Sin years 6 and 7 and involve a royal construction project. The workers on the project included skilled workers such as master builders, and unskilled workers such as brick carriers, free and enslaved. The workers were fed soups and stews and the texts have allowed recreation of the recipes. Many of the tablets have been collected and published. Some of the looted tablets have been repatriated to Iraq.

Most of the tablets concern minor, everyday matters but taken as a whole they provide a useful look at life in the Ur III period. An example text, from Shu-Sin year 8 (the year of his death):

"1 sheep. 1 goat. From Ili-bilani. Booked out. Month: “Harvest.” Year: “He fashioned for them the lofty barge.” SEAL - Šu-kabta, physician, child of Naram-ili: Adad-tillatī, scribe, child of Abia, (is) your slave."

Garšana is mentioned in various other Ur III period texts and inscriptions. On an inscribed door socket dated to about Shu-Sin year 4 found at Girsu:

"Sü-Sín, ... his lord, Ir-Nanna, grand-vizier, governor of Lagas, sanga priest of the god Enki, military governor of Ušar-Garšana, general of Bašime, governor of Sabum and the land of Gutebum, general of Dimat-Enlila, governor of Al-Sü-Sîn, general of Urbillum, governor of Ham(a)zi and Karahar, general of NI.HI, general of Simaški and the land of Karda, his servant, built for him his Girsu temple"

== Location ==
While there is consensus that the royal settlement of Garšana lay within the borders of the Ur III Umma province the specific areal location is uncertain. One earlier proposal put it not far to the northwest of the provincial capital of Umma in the northwest sector of the province, near the ancient city of Karkar, whose location is also yet unknown but is likely Tell Jidr. The alternative view is that the above location is actually that of the unlocated ancient city of NAGsu, also a large royal settlement (Site #275 in an archaeological survey of the area). The alternative proposed location of Garšana is on the Udaga Canal in the east or southwest portion of the Umma province near the border with Girsu/Lagash province and near the ancient city of Girsu, possibly at the archaeological site of Tell Baridiyah. Subsequent texts appear to support the more southeastern proposal.

=== Tell Baridiyah ===
The site (31° 26' 35.53" N, 46° 7' 8.85" E) lies about 14 kilometers southwest of Girsu and 5 kilometers west of the Al-Gharraf River and the modern town of Al-Shatrah. A survey showed it to have an area of about 600 meters by 400 meters with a height of about 3 meters. A surface survey found pottery from the Ur III and Old Babylonian periods and there was heavy looting at the site after the Gulf War in 1991.

== See also ==
- Cities of the Ancient Near East
- Ḫabūrītum
