= Nini Suhien National Park =

National park and tourist site in Ghana

Nini-Suhien National Park
- IUCN category II (national park)
- Location within Ghana
- Location: Ghana
- Coordinates: 5°16′N 2°34′W
- Area: 160 km^{2} (62 sq mi)
- Established: 1976

The Nini-Suhien National Park is found in Ghana. It was established in 1976. This site is 160 square kilometres (62 sq mi) in size. Along with the Ankasa Resource Reserve, the national park is part of the 500-square-kilometre (190 sq mi) Ankasa Conservation Area.

== Environment ==
The Ankasa reserve, along with the Nini-Sushien National Park, has been designated an Important Bird Area (IBA) by BirdLife International because it supports significant populations of many bird species.
