= Alessandro Pericle Ninni =

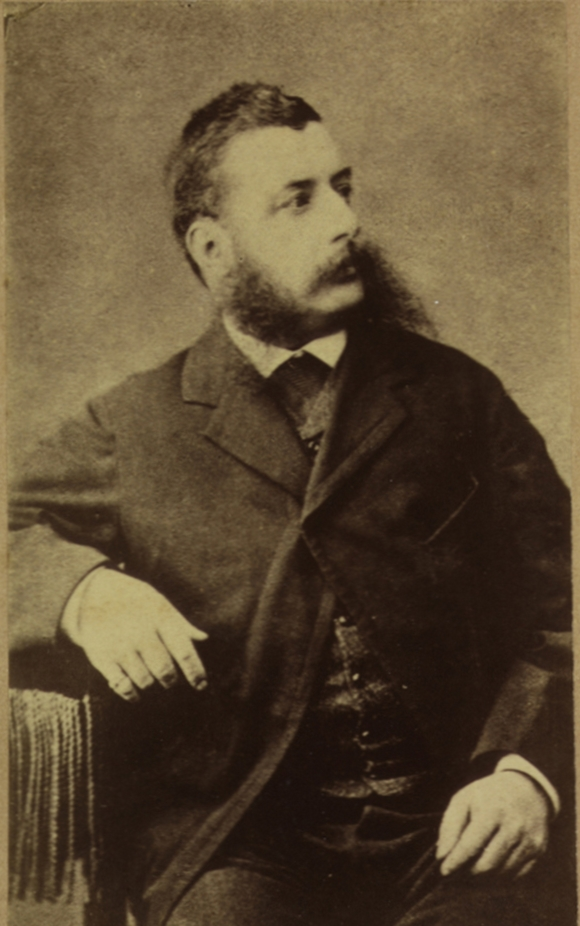

Alessandro Pericle Ninni or Alessandro Pericle Count of Ninni (4 April 1837 – 7 January 1892) was an Italian nobleman of Greek descent. He specialized in zoology and was especially known for his studies of the fishes of the Adriatic. He described several species of fish including the black-spot goby Pomatoschistus canestrinii, endemic to the Adriatic Sea. He also studied helminth parasites, molluscs and insects and took an interest in linguistics, culture, and antiquities.

Ninni was born in Venice, then part of the Austrian Empire, and after studies in the University of Venice he travelled across Europe, visiting museums. He was involved in the reorganization of the zoological museum in Athens in 1863 and in 1867 he began to study the fauna of Venice and the Adriatic. In 1867 he founded a journal on the fauna and flora of Venice and Trentino along with Pier Andrea Saccardo. The journal was however short-lived. Ninni took an interest in the lore of seafarers, linguistics and cartography. He described outbreaks of crayfish in Venice, the entry of Risso's dolphins into Venice and other zoological events. He collected specimens and his collections were donated to the Venice natural history museum. His son Emilio Ninni also added to these collections, particularly of fish, which were later examined and reorganized by Giuseppe Scarpa (1851-1937) from Treviso.
