= List of national parks of Ghana =

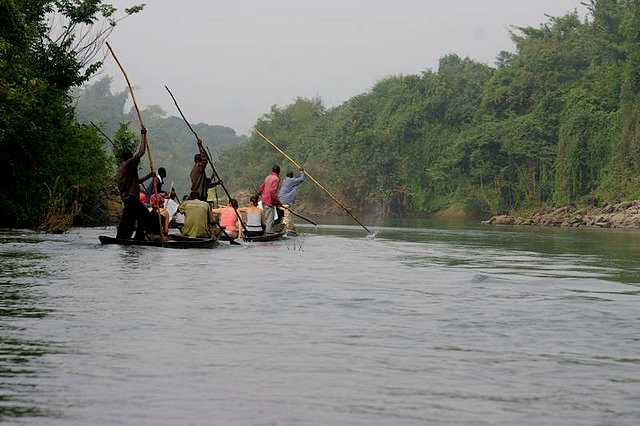
Bui National Park

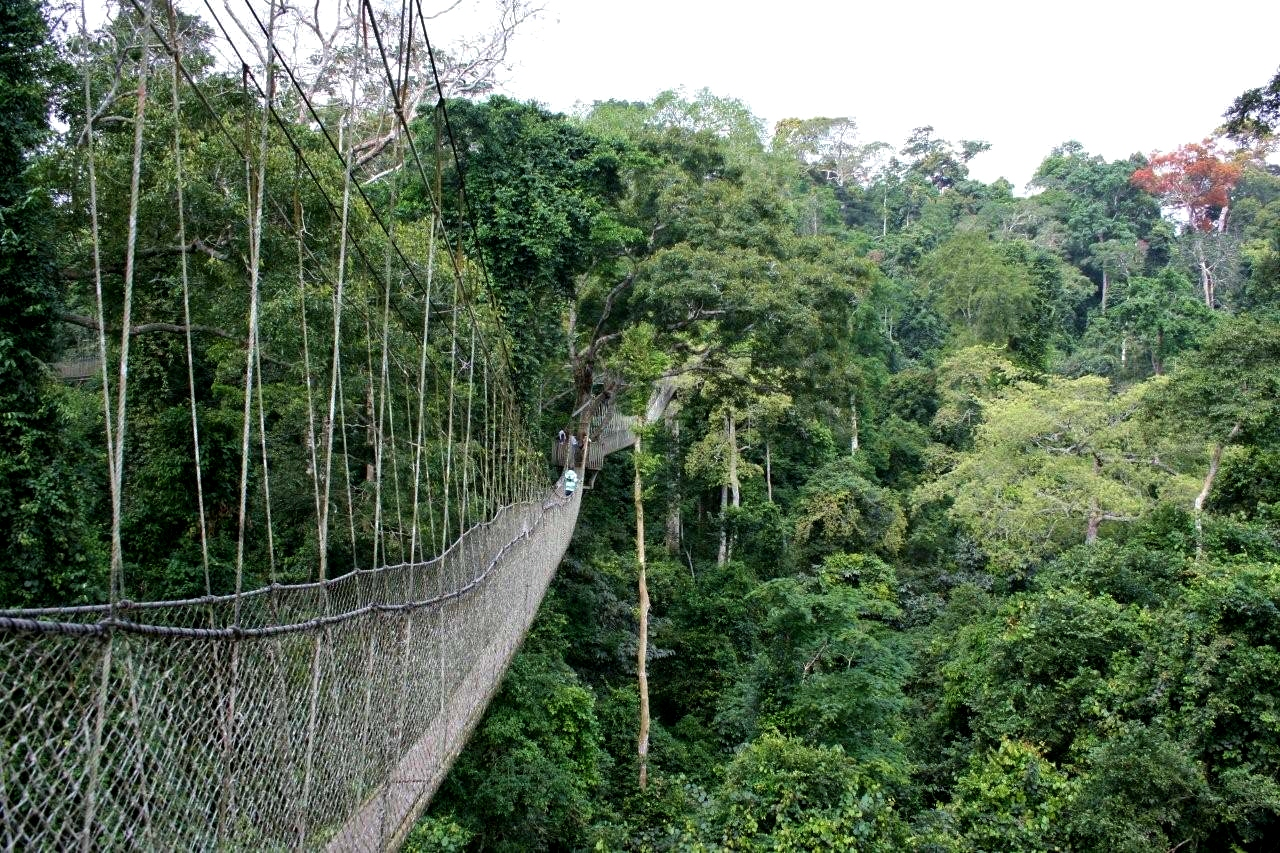
Kakum National Park

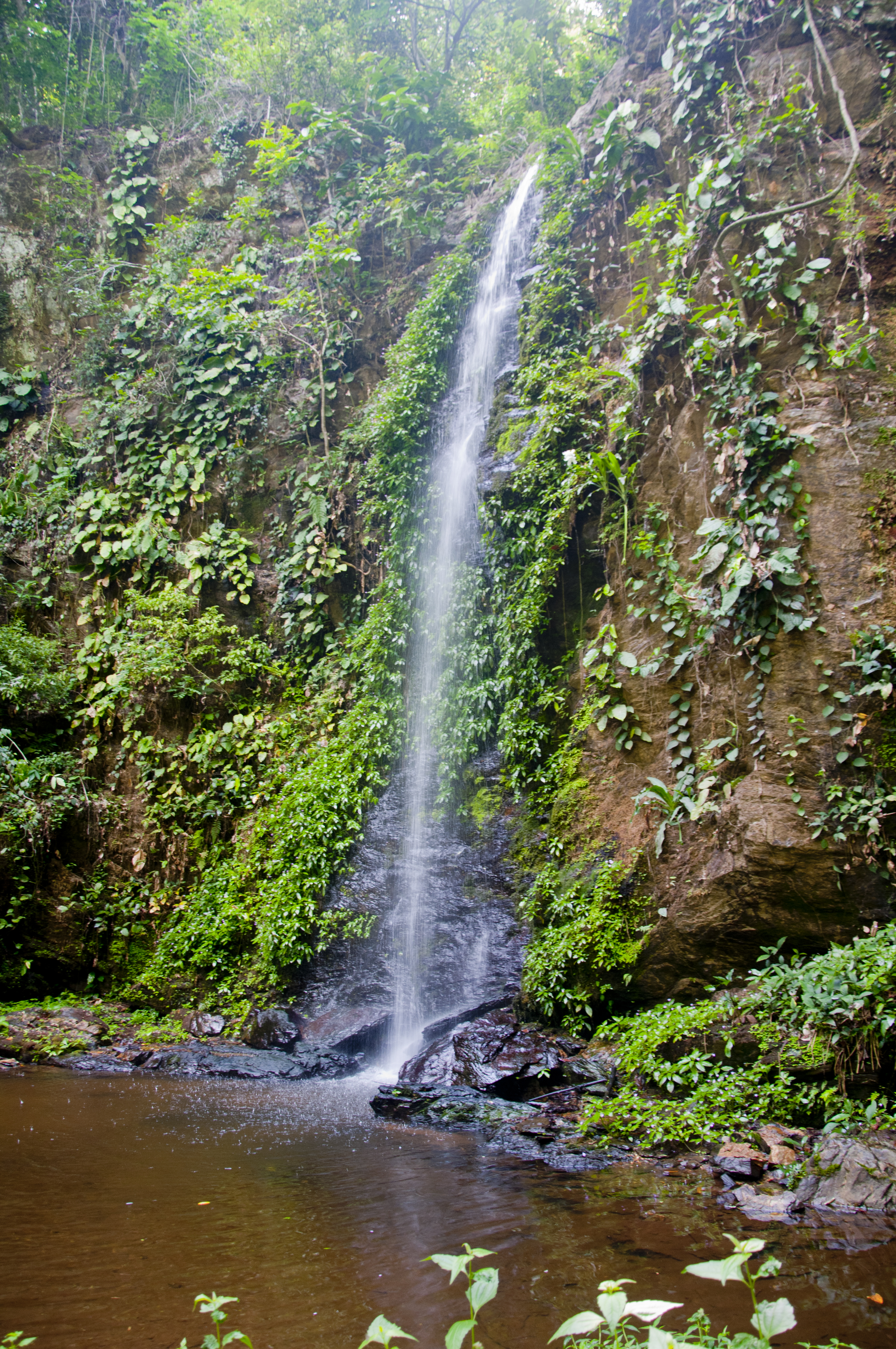
Kyabobo National Park

Ghana has a large system of 21 protected areas which include 7 national parks, 6 Resource Reserves, 2 Wildlife Sanctuaries, 1 Strict Nature Reserve and 5 coastal wetlands.

== National parks ==
- Bia National Park
- Bui National Park
- Digya National Park - A park on the western bank of the Volta Lake that includes large swathes of inland estuary. It is located approximately 100 km to the east of Techiman.
- Kakum National Park - A coastal rainforest in the central region with abundant plant and animal life. Park facilities include access to the upper rainforest canopy. Located 30 km north of Cape Coast.
- Kyabobo National Park
- Mole National Park - A former game reserve in the isolated northern region of Ghana that contains an abundant variety of wildlife. It is located 100 km to the west of Tamale.
- Nini Suhien National Park - A small forest located in the western region near the border of Côte d'Ivoire.

== Conservation sites ==
- Ankasa Conservation Area
- Assin-Attandanso Game Production Reserve
- Asubima Forest Reserve
- Ayum Forest Reserve
- Boin Tano Forest Reserve
- Bonsam Bepo Forest Reserve
- Draw River Forest Reserve
- Gbele Game Production Reserve
- Krokosua Hills Forest Reserve
- Mamiri Forest Reserve
- Tano Nimiri Forest Reserve
- Kalakpa Game Production Reserve

== See also ==
- List of Ramsar sites in Ghana
