= Eastern Guinean forests =

Tropical moist broadleaf forest ecoregion

Coordinates: 6.3°N 3.6°W

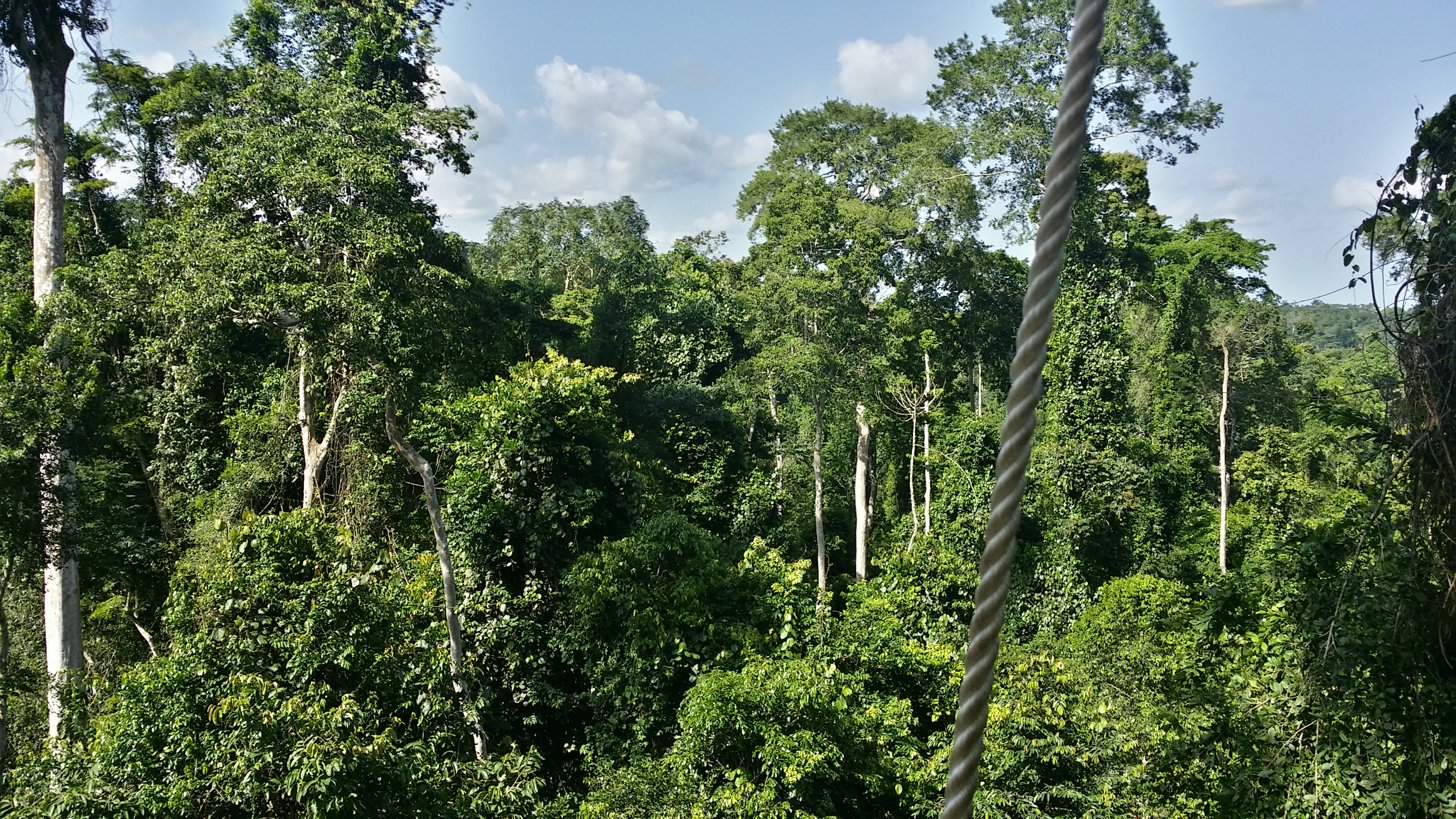
- Kakum National Park, Ghana

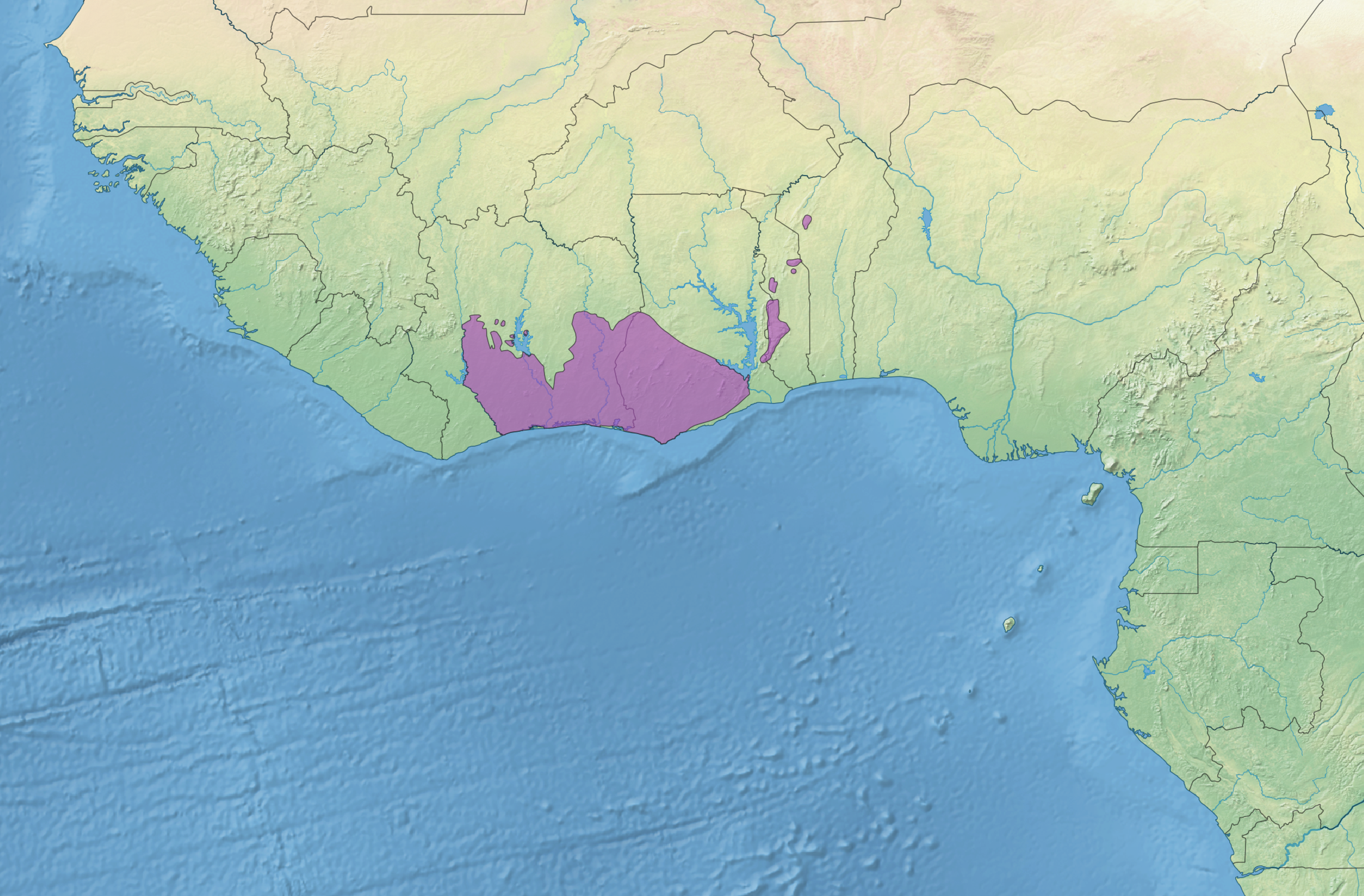
- Map of the Eastern Guinean forests

Ecology
- Realm: Afrotropical
- Biome: tropical and subtropical moist broadleaf forests
- Borders: Guinean forest-savanna mosaic; Guinean mangroves; West Sudanian savanna, Western Guinean lowland forests

Geography
- Area: 187,874 km^{2} (72,539 mi^{2})
- Countries: Ivory Coast; Ghana; Togo, Benin

Conservation
- Conservation status: Critical/endangered
- Global 200: Guinean moist forests
- Protected: 42,299 km² (23%)

The Eastern Guinean forests are a tropical moist broadleaf forest ecoregion of West Africa.

== Geography ==
The ecoregion includes the lowland forests extending from the Gulf of Guinea a few hundred kilometres inland, from western Côte d'Ivoire to the western shore of Lake Volta in Ghana. A few enclaves lie further east and inland in the Togo Mountains of Togo, eastern Ghana, and Benin. The Sassandra River of Cote d'Ivoire separates the Eastern Guinean forests from the Western Guinean forests which lie to the west. Inland and to the east, the Eastern Guinean forests transition to the Guinean forest-savanna mosaic.

Cities in the ecoregion include Abidjan and Yamoussoukro in Ivory Coast and Kumasi in Ghana.

The Eastern Guinean forests, together with the other tropical moist broadleaf forests of West Africa, is included within Conservation International's Guinean Forests of West Africa biodiversity hotspot.

== Climate ==
The climate is tropical, with distinct wet and dry seasons. Average annual rainfall ranges from 2500 mm in the west, declining as one moves inland to 1500 mm along the northern edge and in the mountains of Togo and Benin.

== Flora ==
Tropical moist forest is the predominant vegetation type. Moist evergreen forest is found in the west and along the coast, transitioning to moist semi-evergreen forest further inland, and dry semi-evergreen forest in the north.

Characteristic trees of the moist evergreen forest are Entandrophragma utile, Khaya ivorensis, and Triplochiton scleroxylon. Dominant trees in the moist semi-evergreen forests are Celtis spp., Mansonia altissima, Pterygota macrocarpa, Nesogordonia papaverifera, Sterculia rhinopetala, and Milicia excelsa. Trees of the Togo Mountains forests include Milicia excelsa, Triplochiton scleroxylon, Antiaris toxicaria africana, Diospyros mespiliformis, Afzelia africana, and Ceiba pentandra.

== Fauna ==
Four mammals are endemic to the ecoregion – Wimmer's shrew (Crocidura wimmeri), Ivory Coast rat (Dephomys eburneae), Cansdale's swamp rat (Malacomys cansdalei), and Togo mouse (Leimacomys buettneri).

== Protected areas ==
A 2017 assessment found that 42,299 km², or 23%, of the ecoregion is in protected areas. About one-third of the unprotected area is still forested. Protected areas include Gaoulou Natural Park and the southern and western portions of Marahoue National Park in Ivory Coast, and Bia National Park, Kakum National Park, Nini-Suhien National Park, Agmatsa Wildlife Reserve, Boin Tano Forest Reserve, and Mamiri Forest Reserve in Ghana.
