= List of Ramsar sites in Ghana =

Ghana has six (6) designated Ramsar sites. Five (5) wetlands along the coast and one (1) in the interior region.

== Greater Accra ==
- Densu Delta Ramsar Site
- Sakumono Ramsar Site
- Songor Ramsar Site

== Volta Region ==
- Keta Lagoon

== Greater Kumasi ==
- Owabi

== Central Region ==
- Muni-Pomadze Ramsar Site

== See also ==
- List of national parks of Ghana
