= Mansonia =

Mansonia is the scientific name of two genera of organisms and may refer to:

- Mansonia (fly), a genus of insects in the family Culicidae
- Mansonia (plant), a genus of plants in the family Malvaceae
