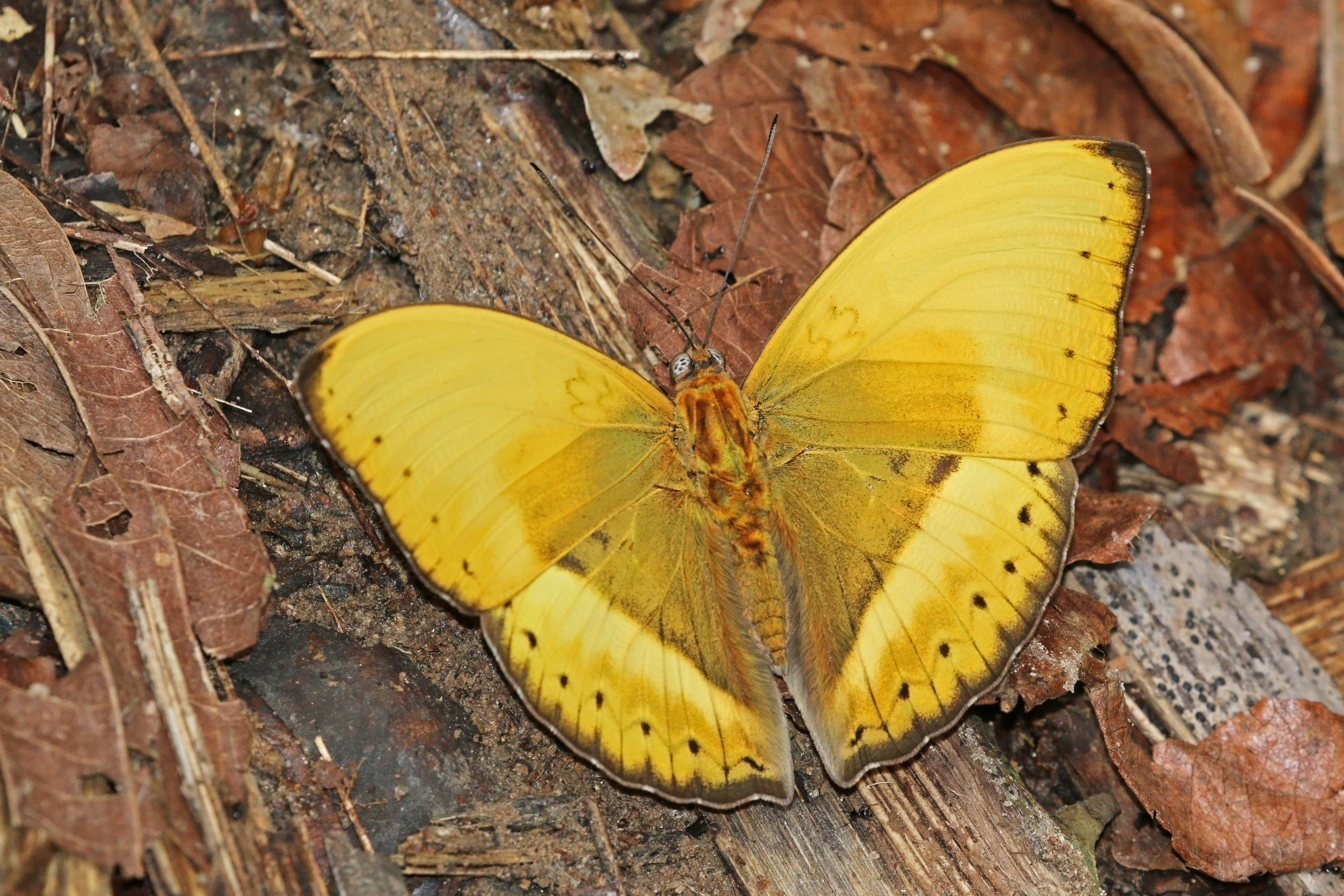
- male C. e. egesta
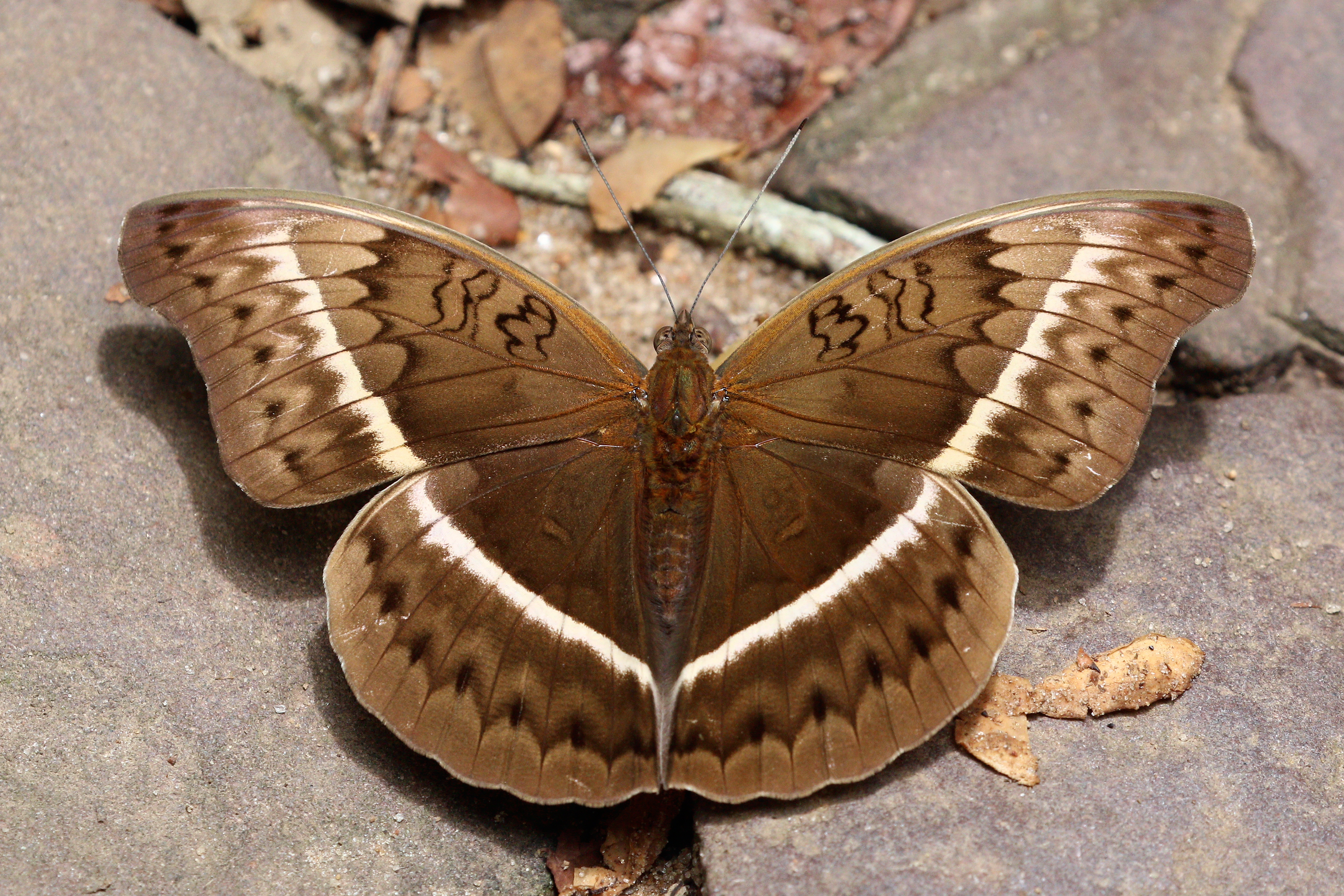
- female C. e. egesta both in Kakum National Park, Ghana

Scientific classification
- Kingdom: Animalia
- Phylum: Arthropoda
- Clade: Pancrustacea
- Class: Insecta
- Order: Lepidoptera
- Family: Nymphalidae
- Genus: Cymothoe
- Species: C. egesta

Binomial name
- Cymothoe egesta (Cramer, 1775)

Synonyms
- Papilio egesta Cramer, 1775; Cymothoe confusa Aurivillius, 1887; Cymothoe egesta var. degesta Staudinger, 1890

= Cymothoe egesta =

Species of butterfly

Cymothoe egesta, the common yellow glider, is a butterfly in the family Nymphalidae. It is found in Sierra Leone, Liberia, Ivory Coast, Ghana, Nigeria, Cameroon, Gabon, the Republic of the Congo, the Central African Republic, the Democratic Republic of the Congo, Uganda and Tanzania. The habitat consists of lowland to sub-montane forests, including secondary growth.

Males mud-puddle and both sexes are attracted to fermenting fruit. They have also been recorded feeding from the flowers of Cleistopholis patens.

The larvae feed on Rinorea species.

== Subspecies ==
- Cymothoe egesta egesta (Sierra Leone, Liberia, Ivory Coast, Ghana to western Nigeria)
- Cymothoe egesta confusa Aurivillius, 1887 (Nigeria: Cross River loop, Cameroon, Gabon, Congo, Central African Republic, Democratic Republic of the Congo, western Uganda, north-western Tanzania)

Torben Larsen developed a species numbering system for his 2005 publication Butterflies of West Africa. The nominate subspecies is #851. The 'Larsen' numbers have since been used with permission in A Sharp Eye on Butterflies of Ghana.

== Gallery ==
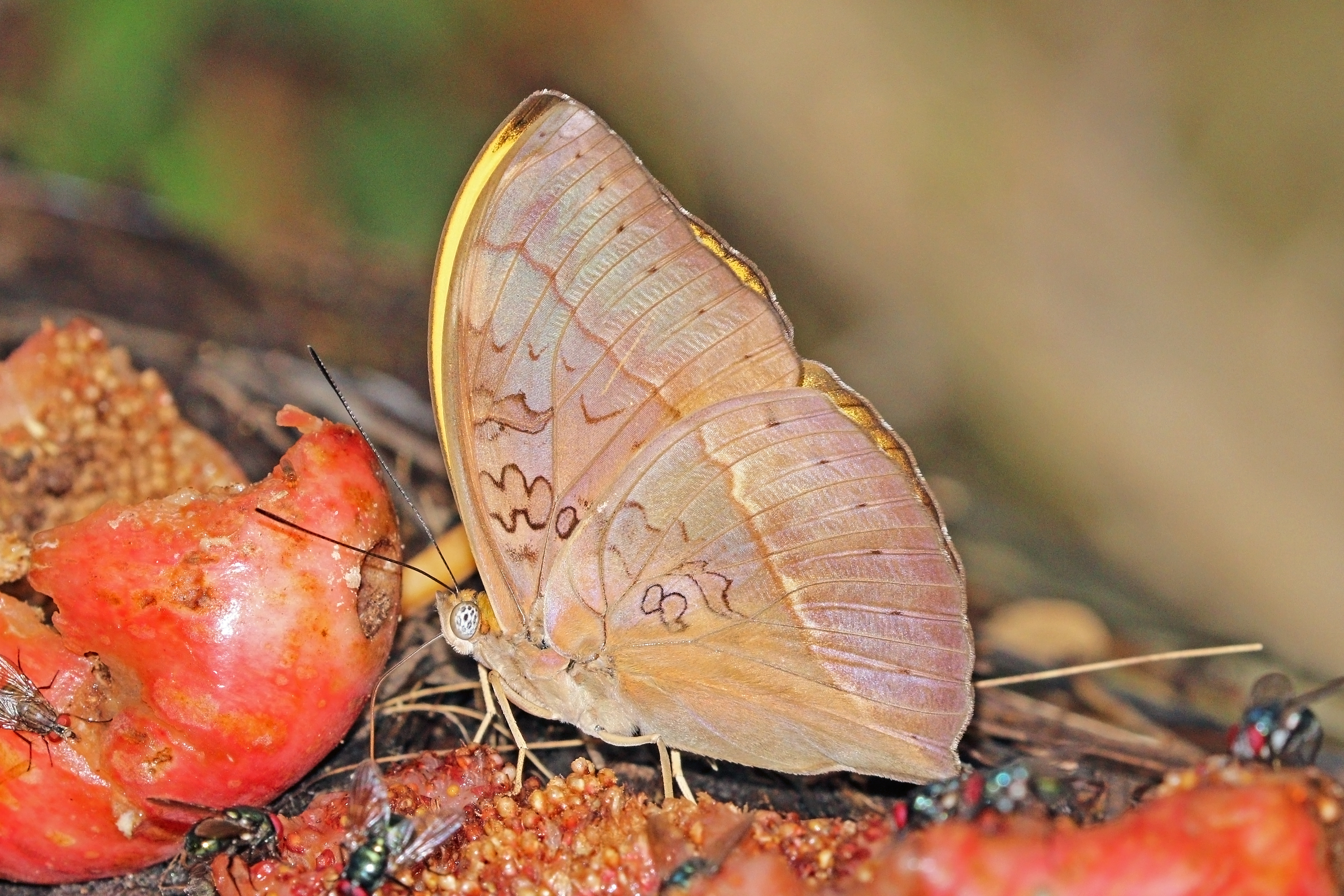
male C. e. egesta
Kakum National Park, Ghana

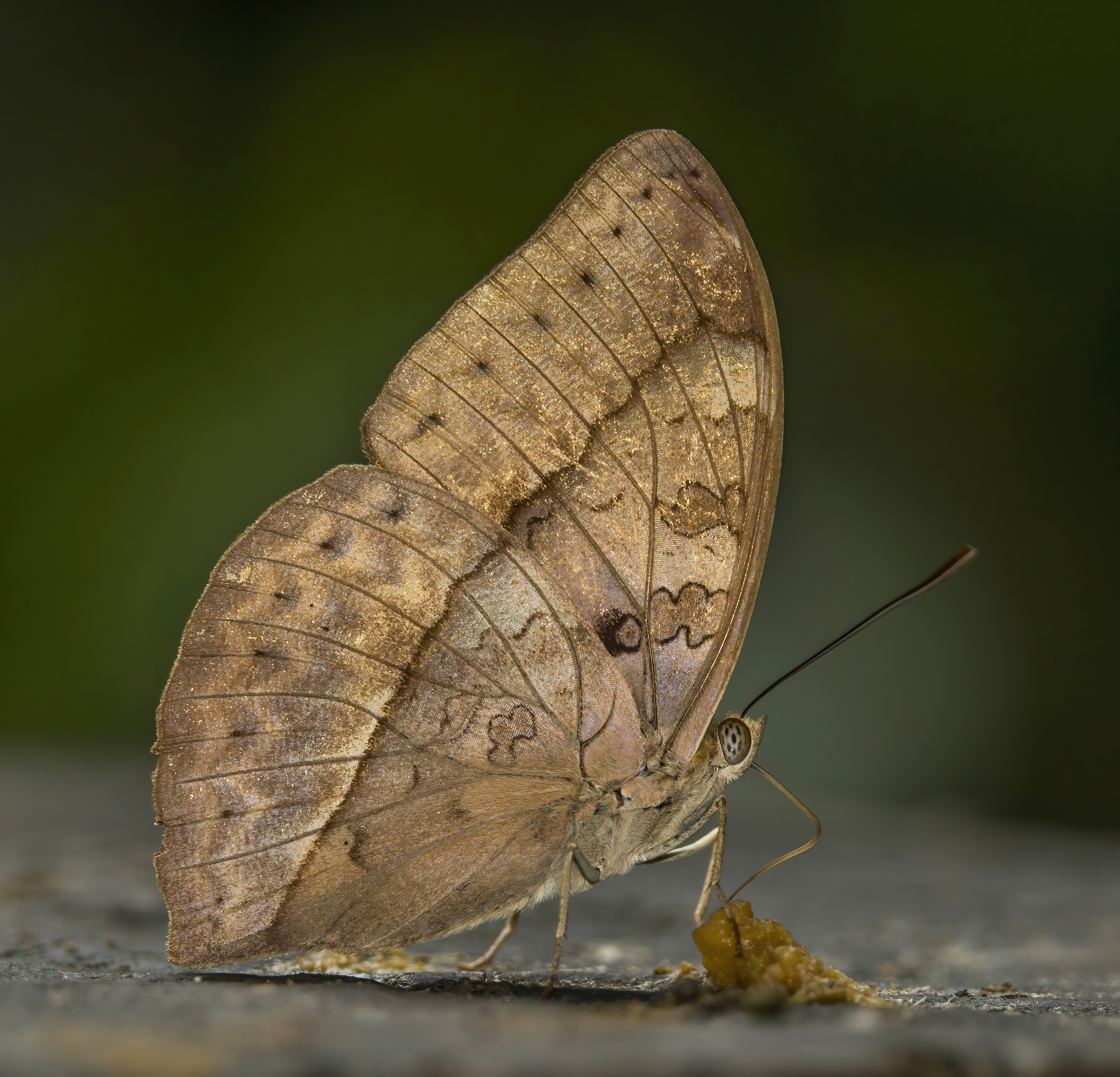
female C. e. egesta
Kakum National Park, Ghana
