= Kakum National Park =

National park in Ghana

- IUCN category II (national park)
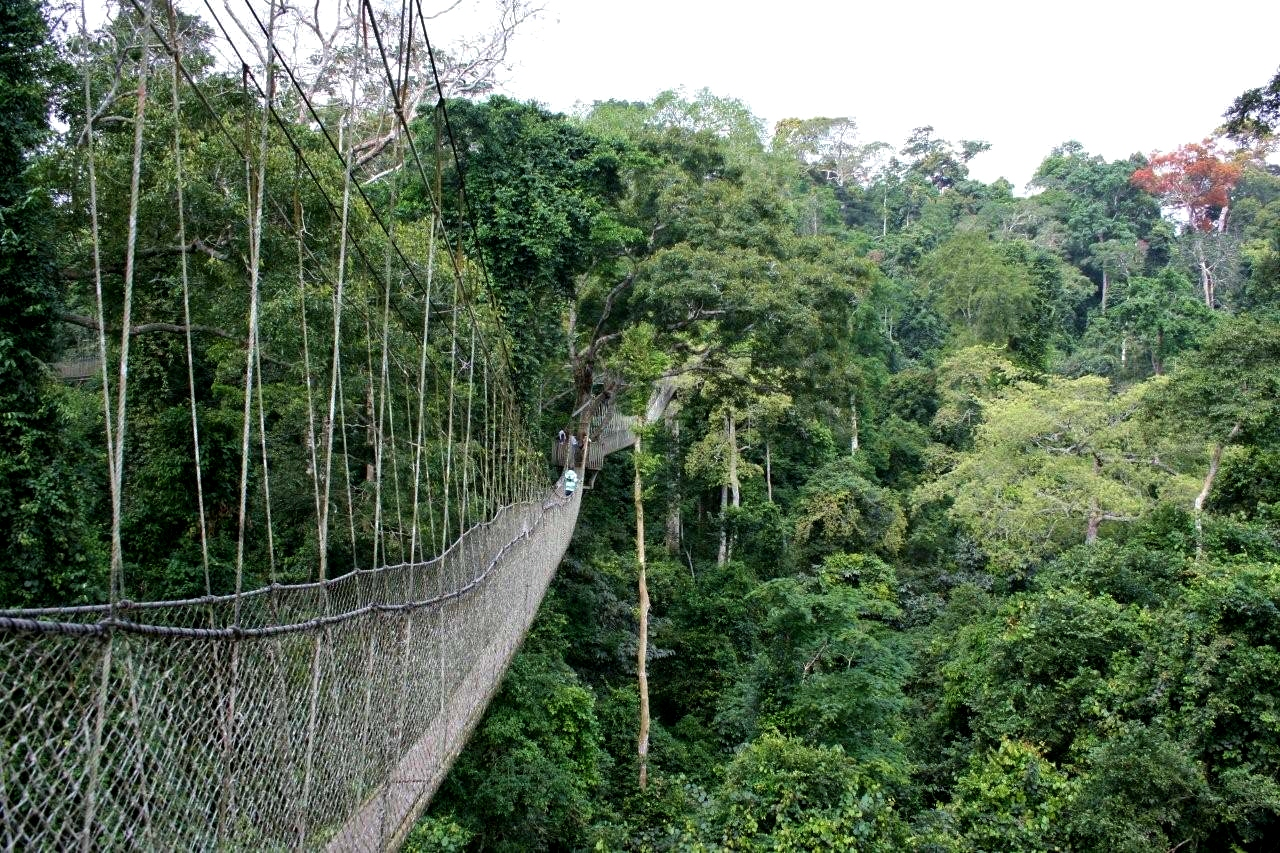
- The Kakum Canopy Walk

- Location within Ghana
- Location: Central Region of Ghana
- Coordinates: 5°21′13″N 1°23′00″W
- Area: 375 km^{2} (145 sq mi)
- Established: 1992

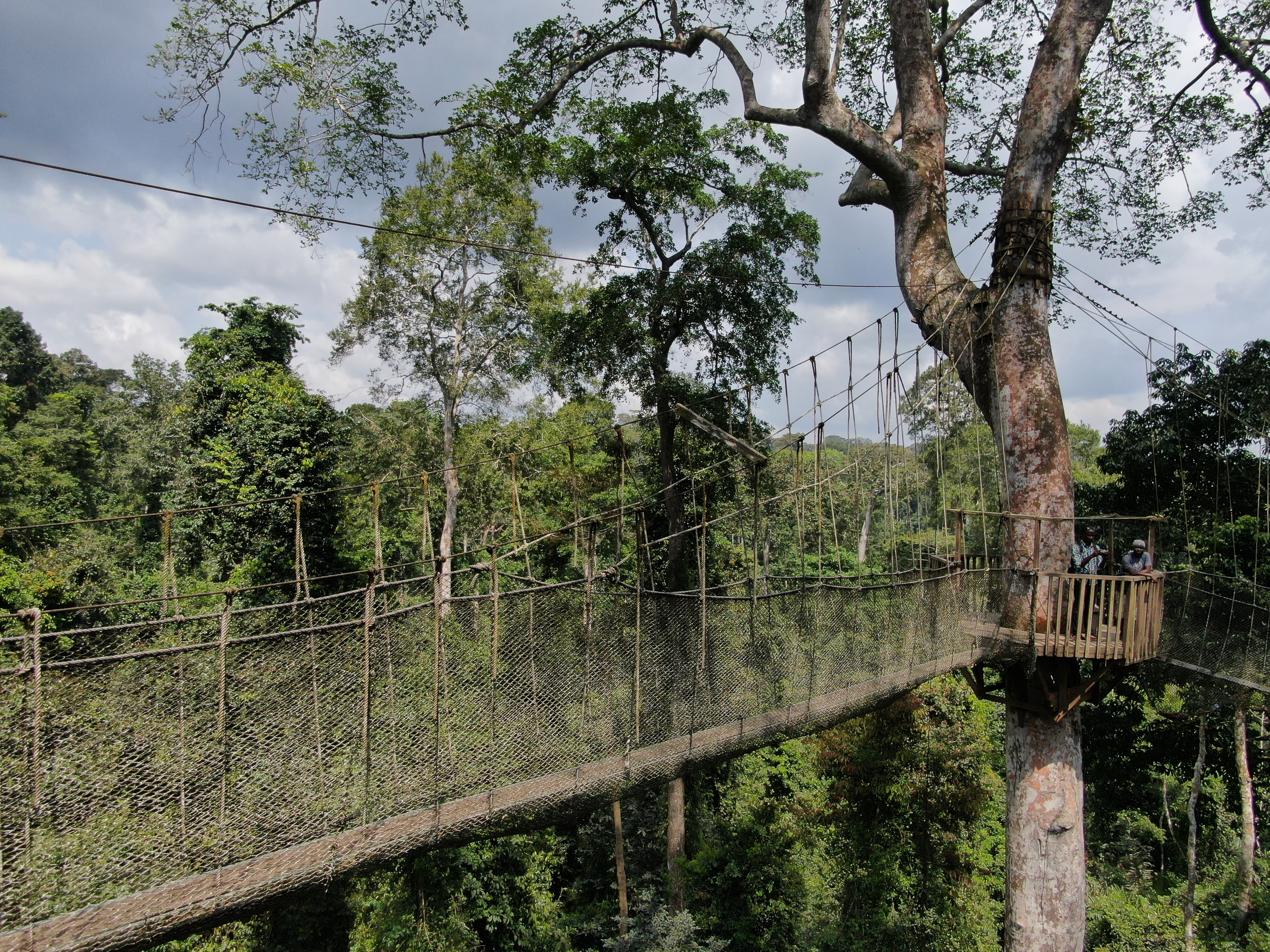
The canopy walk

Kakum National Park, located in the coastal environs of the Central Region of Ghana, covers an area of 375 square kilometres (145 sq mi). Established in 1931 as a reserve, it was gazetted as a national park only in 1992 after an initial survey of avifauna was conducted. The area is covered with tropical forest. The uniqueness of this park lies in the fact that it was established at the initiative of the local people and not by the State Department of wildlife who are responsible for wildlife preservation in Ghana. It is one of only 3 locations in Africa with a canopy walkway, which is 350 metres (1,150 ft) long and connects seven tree tops which provides access to the forest.

The most notable endangered species of fauna in the park are Diana monkey, giant bongo antelope, yellow-backed duiker and African elephant. It is also an Important Bird Area recognized by the Bird Life International with the bird area fully overlapping the park area. The bird inventory confirmed 266 species in the park, including eight species of global conservation concern. One of these species of concern is the white-breasted guineafowl. Nine species of hornbill and the grey parrot have been recorded. And it also has more than 600 butterflies as well, and a new species was discovered in 1993. As of 2012, the densest population of forest elephants in Ghana is located in Kakum.

The Museums and Monuments Board of the Republic of Ghana has proposed that UNESCO declare the park a natural World Heritage Site under criteria vii and x. The submission made in 2000 is listed under the tentative List of World Heritage Sites.

== History ==
In 1931, the area drained by the headwater catchment of the Kakum River was declared a forest reserve and managed by the Forestry Division. During this period, logging operations were prevalent, particularly of the mahogany (Khaya ivorensis) tree species. The logging operations continued till 1989 when the management of the reserve was transferred to the Wildlife Department.

A Feasibility Study and Preliminary 5-year Management Plan for the development of Kakum National Park as an ecotourism destination were developed in 1990 under a project conducted for the United Nations Development Program (Dudley 1990). The Feasibility Study included preliminary biodiversity assessments of the flora and fauna of Kakum Forest Reserve and adjoining Assin-Attandanso Forest Reserve, and an elephant population survey (Dudley 1990; Dudley, Mensah-Ntiamoah,& Kpelle 1992; Dudley 1995). The Feasibility Study and Preliminary 5-year Management Plan were developed in a collaborative and consultative process involving a consulting biologist, forestry officials, wildlife officials, local communities, Ghanaian universities, regional government officials, and other key stakeholders (Dudley 1992).

It must be recognized that one, Mr. Ebenezer Kwasi Agbley, the then Central Regional Manager for Ghana Tourist Board gave birth to this dream under a program he initiated and implemented - Tourism Development Scheme for Central Region (TODSCER) which was expanded and became CENTRAL REGION DEVELOPMENT PROGRAM under a later created Commission - Central Region Development Commission (CECECOM). He showcased the TODSCER program in America and drew a number of sponsoring institutions both bilateral and multi-lateral from the donor community for the project to its maturity. The project later brought on board Game & Wildlife to manage and maintain the Park.

In 1992, the Wildlife Department gazetted Kakum to be a park under the Wildlife Reserves Regulations (Ll 1525) as the Kakum Conservation Area including the Assin Attandanso Forest Reserve. After a survey of the faunal richness of the conservation area, it was split into the Kakum National Park and the Assin Attandanso Forest Reserve during the same year. The split was justified with the argument that Cape Coast and 33 other towns and villages continue to need timber from the forest and potable water provided by the Kakum River.

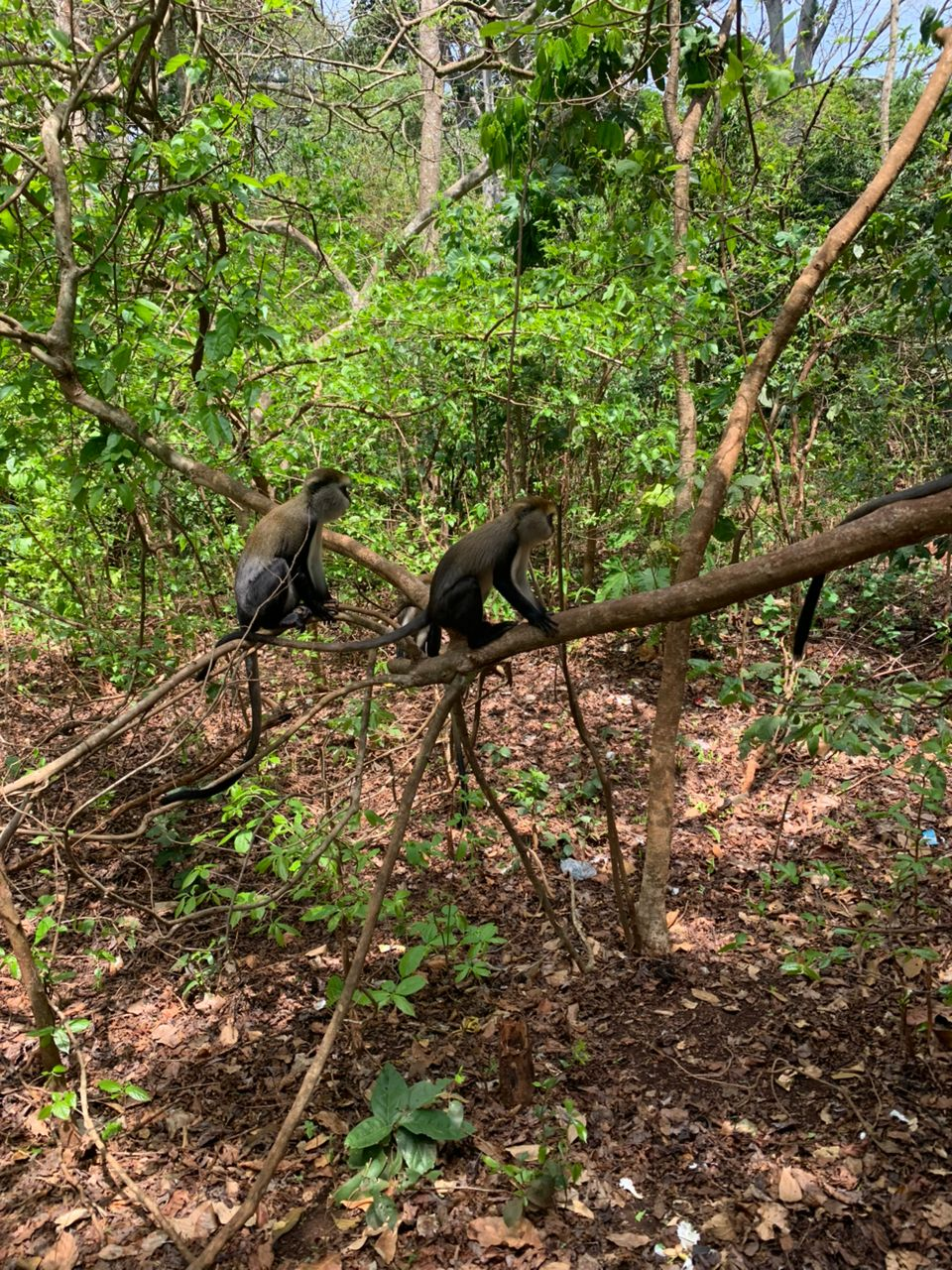
the image consist of some monkeys at the kakum national park

== Geography ==
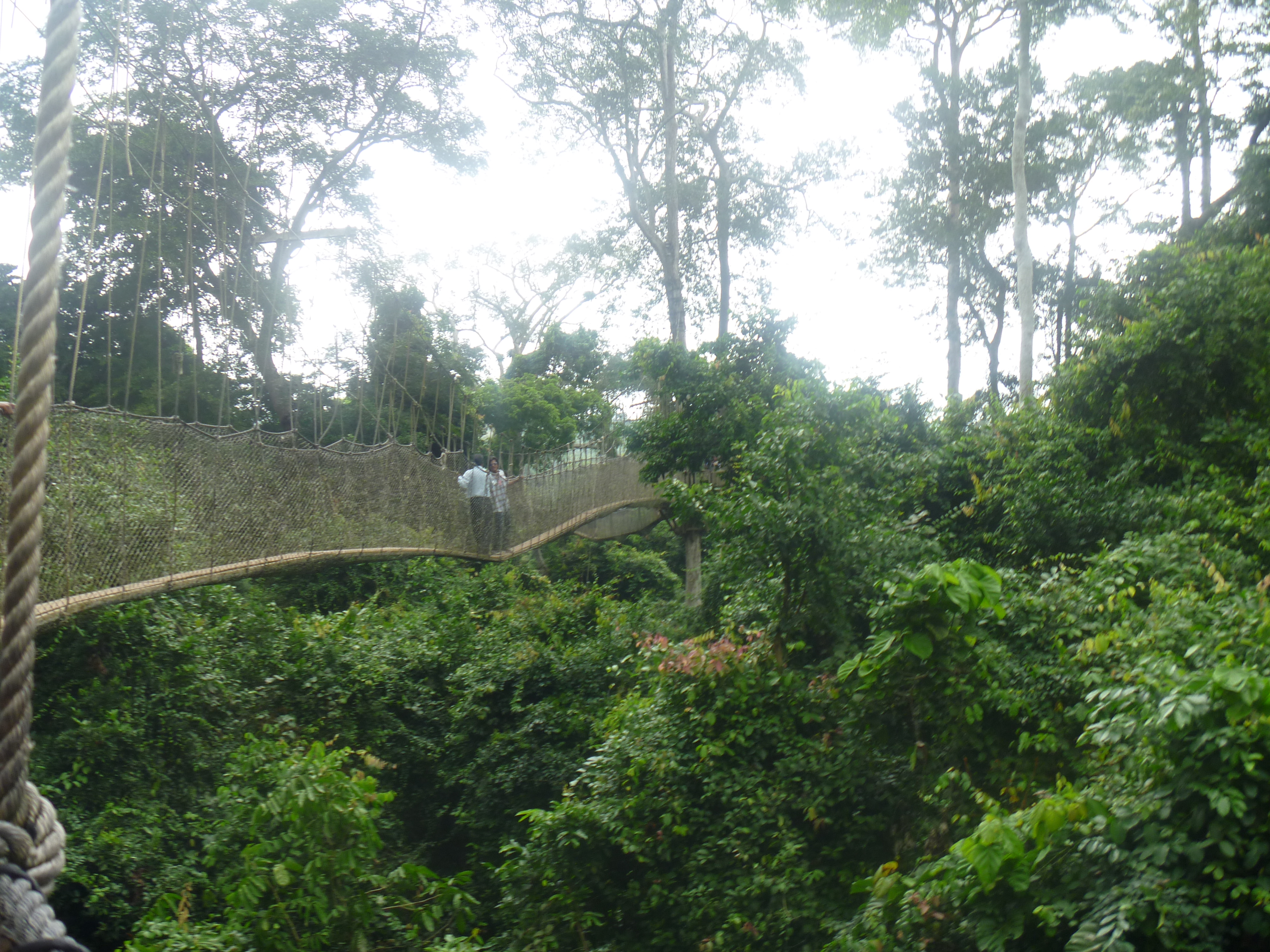
Kakum National Park

The Kakum River originates within the park, and hence the park is named after the river. Its tributaries which flow through the park are Obuo, Kakum, Afia, Sukuma, Nemimi, Aboabo and Ajuesu. It is located 33 kilometres (21 mi) north of Cape Coast and Elmina near the small village of Abrafo. It is easily accessible by taxis from the town center, and through organized tour buses. The park's welcome center contains a restaurant, lodge, picnic area, camping area, and a wildlife education center. The park is surrounded by 33 villages and also agricultural lands where food crops and coco are grown.

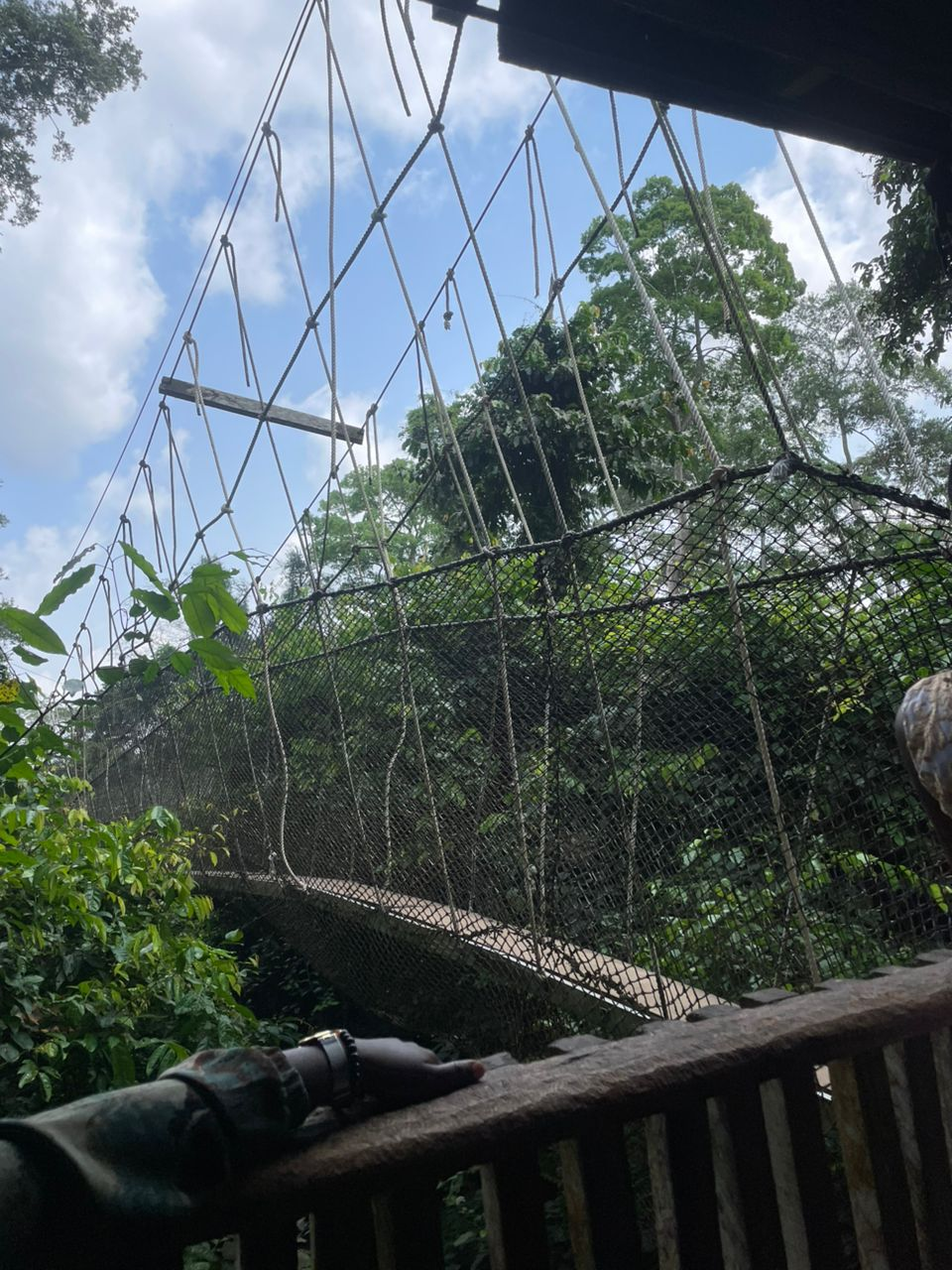
the side view of the walk way for the kakum national park

The park lies within an elevation range of 135–250 metres (443–820 ft). It is part of the Guineo-Congolian region under IUCN Category II. The reserve which borders this park is the Assin-Attandanso Game Production Reserve (game production reserve). Its habitat consists mainly of moist evergreen forest and also seasonal dry semi-deciduous forest. The habitat is formed of 90% forest area, 36% artificial terrestrial landscape while the remaining area has not been categorised. The park area receives an annual average rainfall of 1380 mm.

== Flora ==
The dominant vegetation type in Kakum is the wet forest. Other vegetation types encountered in the park include swamp forests (permanent and periodic) and riverine forests. Also reported are the Boval vegetation of Hildegardia barteri–Polycarpaea tenuifolia community found in exposed granite rocks and in shallow soils. 105 species of vascular plants consisting of 57 trees, 10 shrubs, 9 climbers, 17 herbs and 12 grasses are reported from the park. Epiphytic plants are also reported to grow on the trees and shrubs are orchids and ferns and also figs.

Logging operations were prevalent in the park between 1975 and 1989. It is, however, noted that the logged areas have regenerated secondary forest consisting of a thick green mantle and vine tangles. This does not extend over the entire park, as much of the dense forest still remains conserved.

Specifically IUCN identified list of flora are listed below under subheadings of Moist forests, Swamp forest, Periodic swamp forest, Riverine forest and Boval vegetation.

Moist forests

- Entandrophragma cylindricum
- Entandrophragma angolense
- Guarea cedrata
- Guarea thompsonii
- Piptadeniastrum africanum
- Milicia excelsa (Lophira alata)
- Triplochiton scleroxylon
- Sterculia rhinopetalia
- Sterculia oblonga
- Pterygota macrocarpa
- Anigeria robusta
- Terminalia superba
- Strombosia glaucescens
- Cola gigantea
- Mansonia altissima
- Celtis zenkeri
- Ricinodendron heudelotii
- Antiaris toxicaria

Swamp forests

- Alstonia boonei
- Cleistopholis patens
- Carapa procera
- Mitragyna stipulosa
- Raphia vinifera
- Calamus deeratus (palm)
- Laccosperma secundiflorum
- Laccosperma opacum
- Eremospatha macrocarpa
- Glyphaea brevis (shrub)
- Myriathus arboreus
- Paullinia pinnata
- Thaumatococcus daniellii (herb)
- Sarcophrynium brachystachys
- Ataenidia conferta

Riverine forest (Edaphic forest)

- Pseudospondias microcarpa
- Ceiba pentandra
- Xylopia spp.
- Uapaca guineensis

Boval vegetation

- Sansevieria liberica
- Commelina spp
- Hildegardia barteri (red flowers bloom during Christmas)
- Euphorbia grandifolia
- Sterculia tragacantha
- Ceiba pathandra
- Albizia ferruginea
- Ricinodendron heudelotii

== Fauna ==
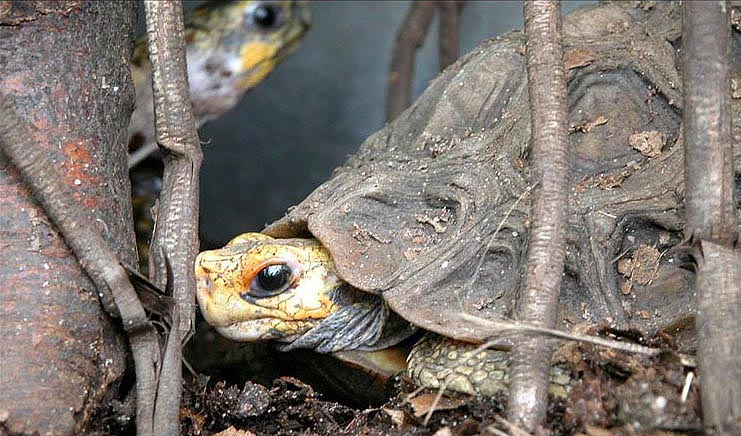
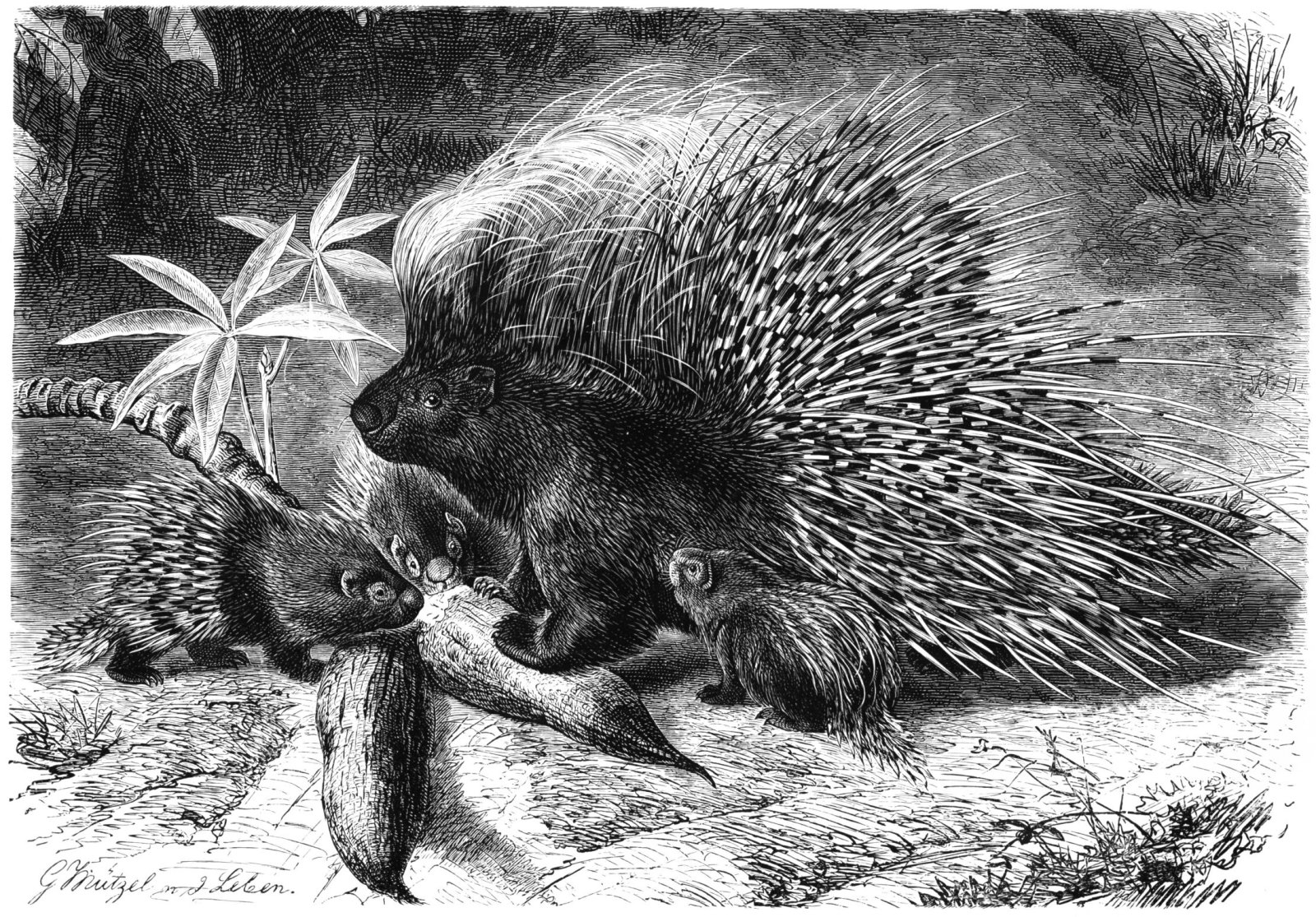
Left: Home's hinged tortoise. Right: North African crested porcupine

The park contains rare animals, including forest elephants, forest buffalo, civet and cats. Two hundred forest elephants, potto, Demidoff's galago African civet, two-spotted palm civet, leopard, bongo, many species of duikers (small antelopes), red river hog, giant forest hog, long-tailed pangolin, white-belied pangolin, giant pangolin, many species of forest squirrels, North African crested porcupine, dwarf crocodile, monitor lizards, Home's hinged tortoise, serrated tortoiseand Giant African Snail, and many other fauna are reported from the park.

Primates in the park include the ursine colobus (CR), olive colobus (VU) and Roloway monkey (CR).

The initial Feasibility Study for the establishment of Kakum National Park included a preliminary biodiversity survey of the fauna of the Kakum Forest Reserve and adjoining Assin-Attandanso Forest Reserve, and a survey of the area's resident African forest elephant population. The elephant population size in 1990 was estimated on the basis of spoor data to be 100–150 individuals (Dudley, Mensah-Ntiamoah, & Kpelle 1992).

=== Avifauna ===
Bird Life International has included the park in its list of Important Bird Areas in Ghana in 2002 under the criteria A1, A2, A3. The species recorded are 266 and the species, though identified but yet to be confirmed, are 56. All are resident and most of them are under the Least Concern categorisation. The globally threatened species listed under the Near Threatened category are: green-tailed bristlebill, red-fronted antpecker, rufous-winged illadopsis, and copper-tailed glossy-starling. The Vulnerable species identified are white-breasted guineafowl, brown-cheeked hornbill, yellow-casqued hornbill and yellow-bearded greenbul.

== Special features ==
A particular feature is the Komfo Boateng's Shrine, a circular rock near Aboabo, of approximately 100 metres (330 ft) diameter with Bovine flora of Ceiba pathandra, Albizia furruginea and Ricinodendron heudelotii.

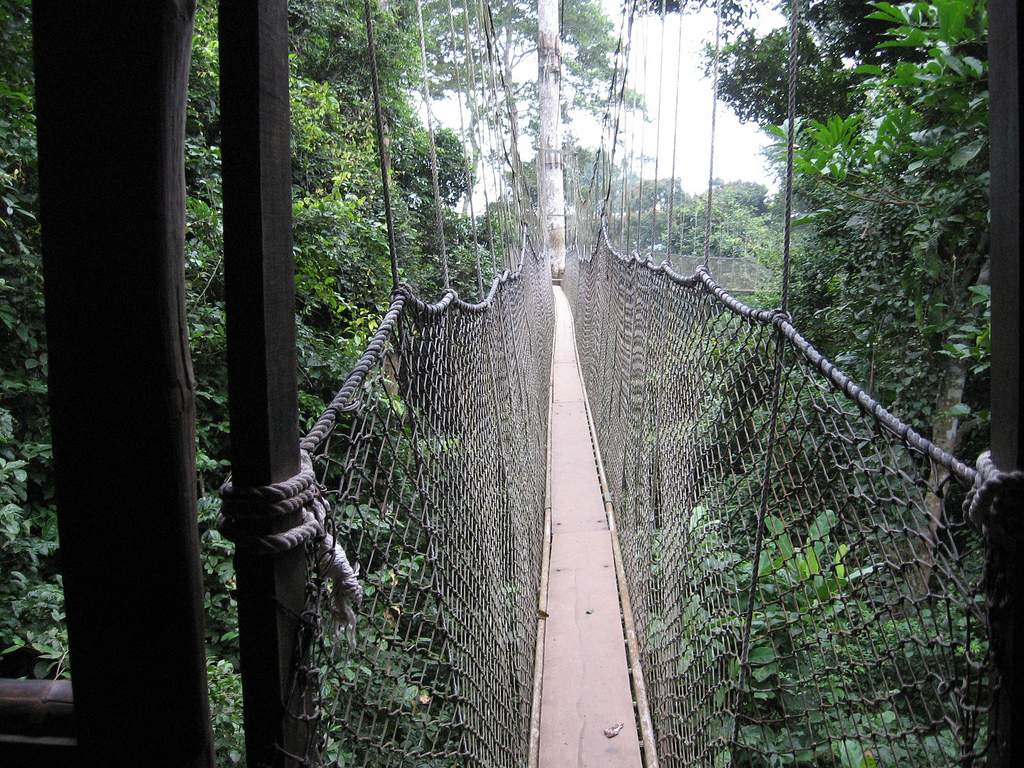
Kakum Canopy Walkway

The park has a long series of hanging bridges known as the Kakum Canopy Walkway at the forest canopy level to provide access to the forest, which is a unique feature in the entire African continent. At 40 m (130 ft) height, the visitor can approach the limits and view plants and animals from a vantage point that would otherwise be inaccessible to people. The canopy walkway passes over 7 bridges and runs over a length of 330 m (1,080 ft). Some of the tree canopies are more than 50 metres (160 ft) in height. Built with wire rope, aluminium ladders, wooden planks, it is secured by a series of netting for safety purposes. An additional viewing platform that will allow visitors to climb into the canopy without braving the canopy walkway is currently under construction. The Canopy Walkway was built by two Canadian engineers from Vancouver with the assistance of five (5) Ghanaians - the latter (staff of Ghana Heritage Conservation Trust- managers of the Kakum National Park Visitor Centre)have been maintaining the facility ever since.

The original concept for establishment of a canopy walkway at this location was the inspiration of Joseph Dudley, a conservation biologist recruited by Conservation International who coordinated the drafting of the Feasibility Study and Preliminary 5-year Management Plan for the development of Kakum National Park as an ecotourism destination under a project conducted for the United Nations Development Program (Dudley 1990).

The Park can now boast of a Tree House which sits about 20metres from the forest floor in the trees in the Secondary Forest. This facility which houses close to 25 people provides an adventurous opportunity for campers to especially at night experience forest life. Due to the thickness of the rainforest, a number of the fauna (genets, leopards, etc.) are active in the night searching for prey to feed on. The Tree House thus provide a close proximity to the wildlife of Kakum. A trained Tour Guide is always on hand to take campers on the night hikes as well as sharing Folklore of the Kakum Forest by a bonfire. It is an intriguing adventure.

== Threats and conservation ==
The threats faced in the park which are being addressed relate to poaching; visible proof has been recorded in the form of "camps, empty matchboxes, pieces of rubber tyres, used carbide, gunshots and cartridges"), hunting, land encroachments and chainsaw operation. Human-wildlife conflicts around the park are due to park elephants damaging the agricultural crops of the farmers. To prevent raids by elephants during the cropping season on the agricultural fields, farmers have adopted the practice of building pepper fences around their lands to protect their farms.

The park is administered by the Wildlife Department of Ghana. Under the direction of Conservation International and with funding support from USAID, Kakum is considered the best protected forest in Ghana. As a result, it is now a major tourist spot. Though poaching is still prevalent, the management practice of involving local communities to share the benefits of the park would yield positive results. In the park, gamekeepers are specially trained in the medical and cultural significance of the local foliage.

== Tourism ==
Kakum is Ghana's first protected area which has received major support for visitor facilities. The visitor centre opened on Earth Day 1997 and the park received the Global Tourism for Tomorrow Award the following year. Tourism numbers have increased over the years: 2,000 in 1992; 27,000 in 1996; over 70,000 tourists in 1999; and it attracted 135,870 visitors during 2009.

== Gallery ==
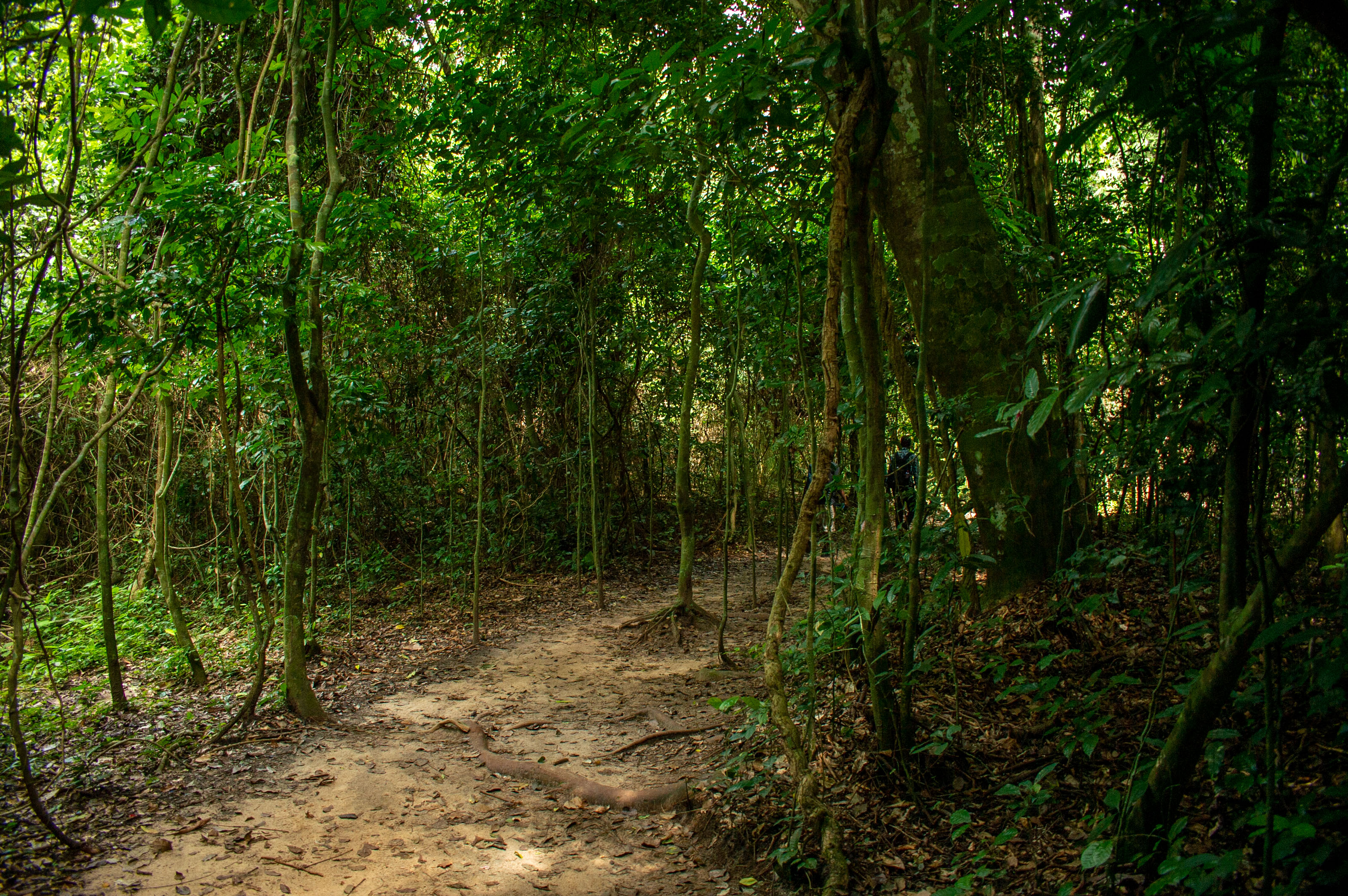
Trees

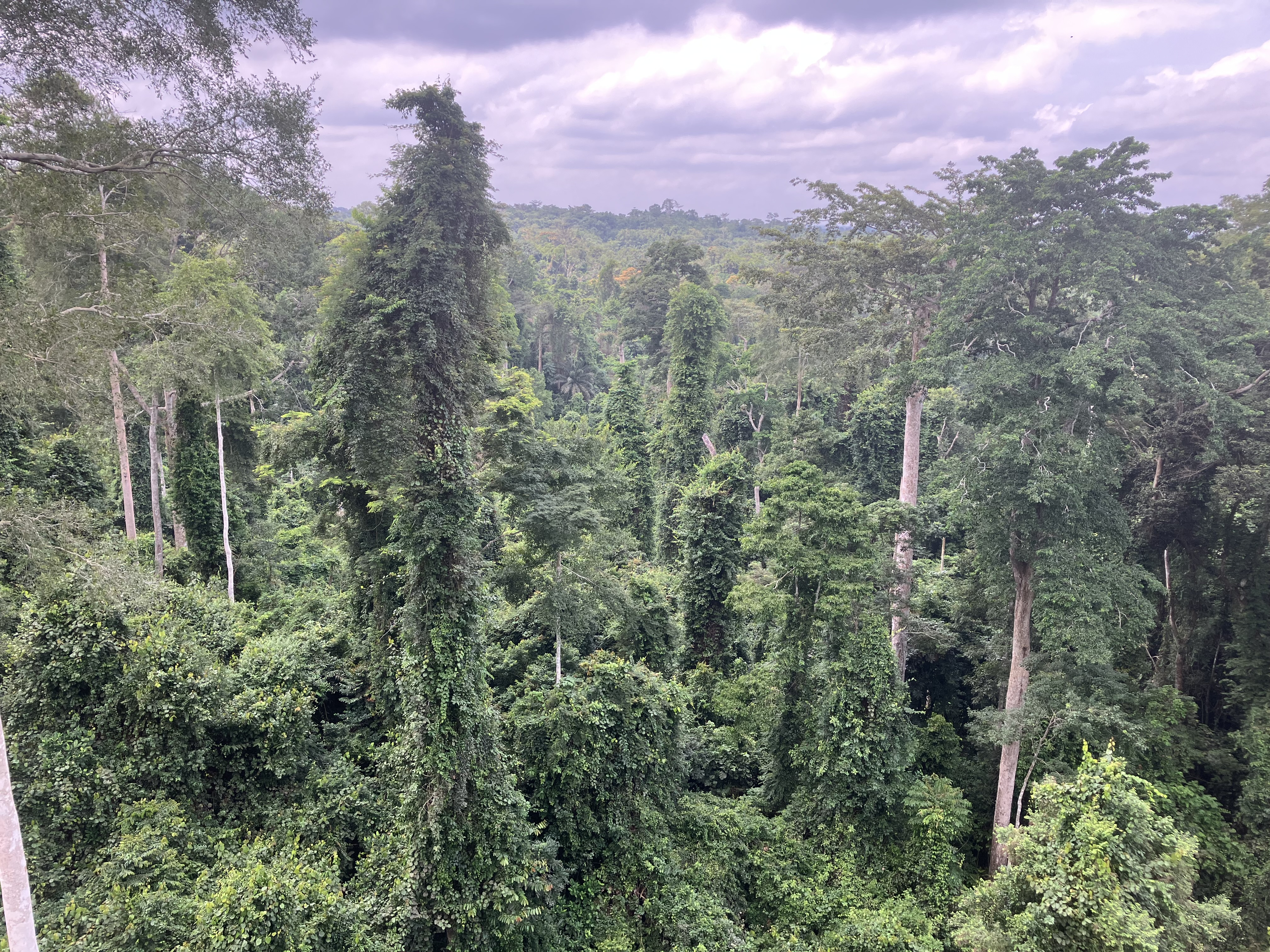
Jungle from above

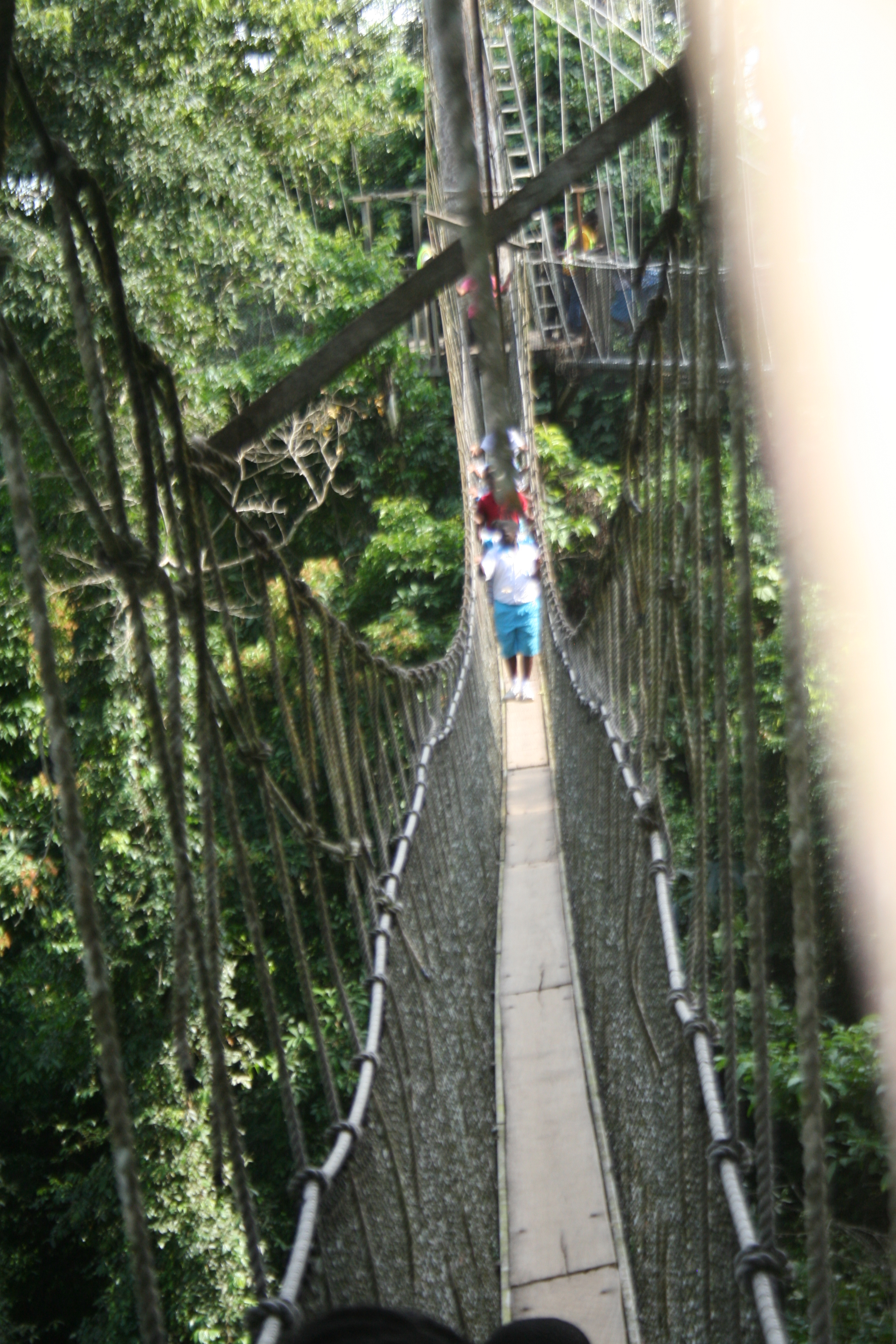
The canopy walkway

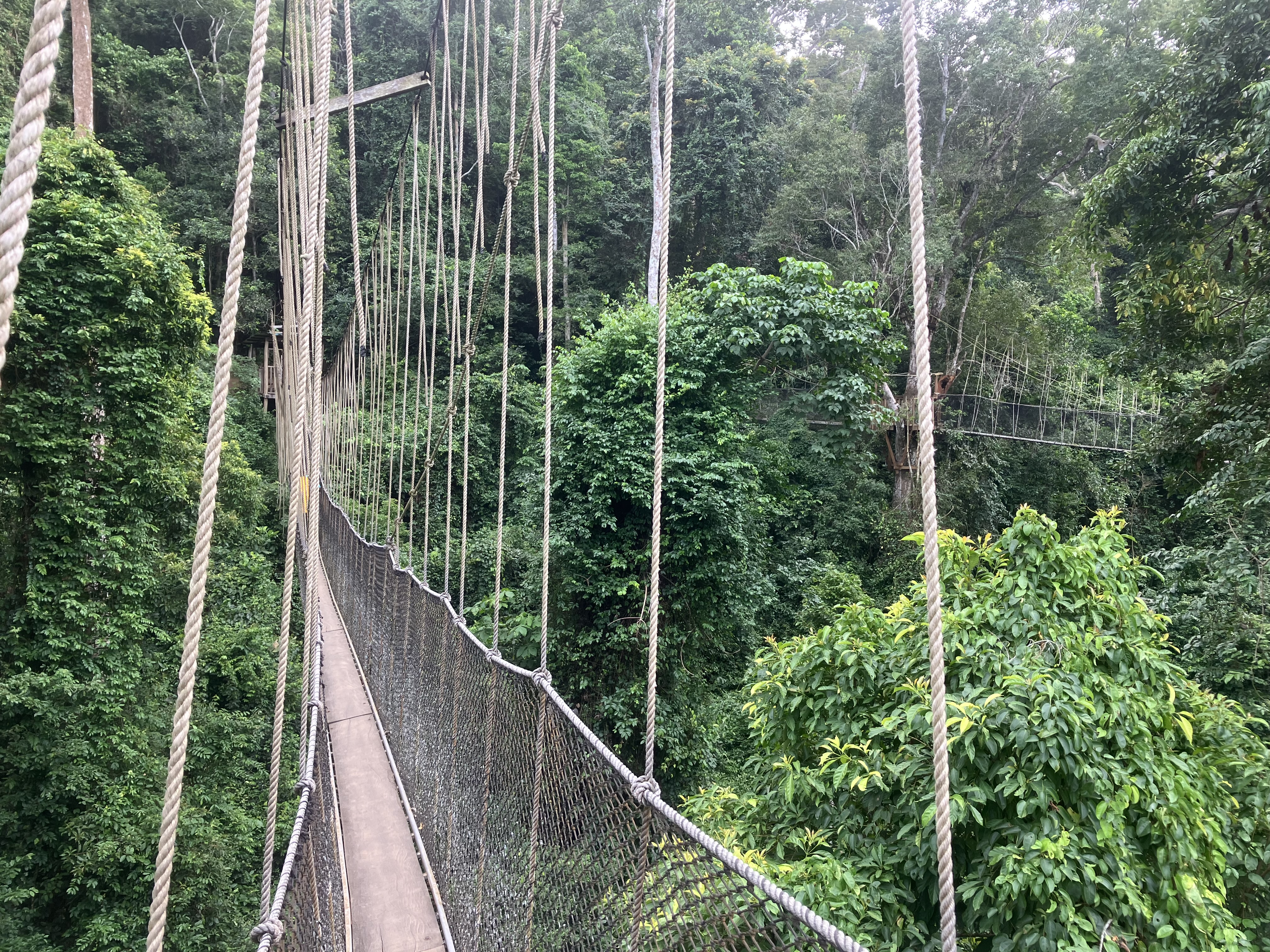
The canopy walkway

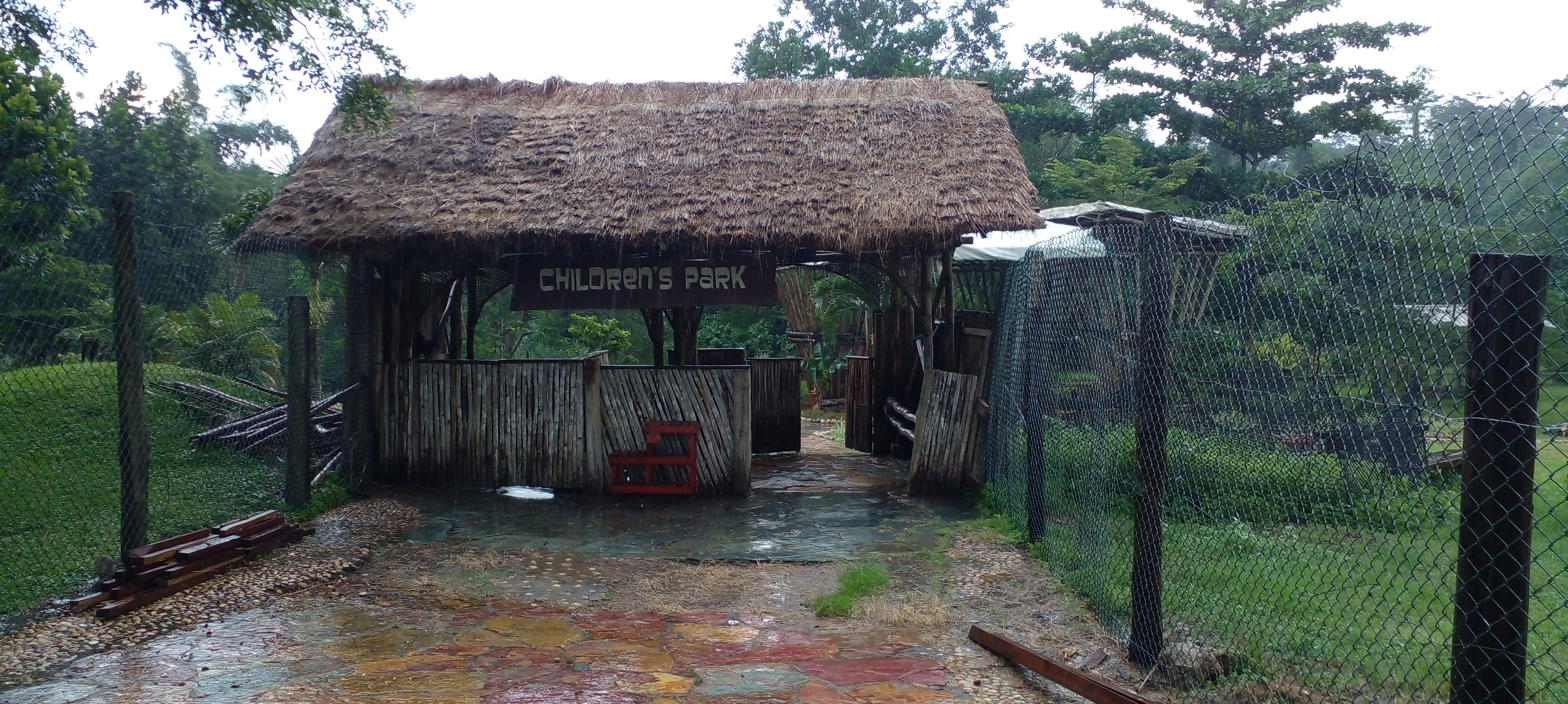
Playground for kids

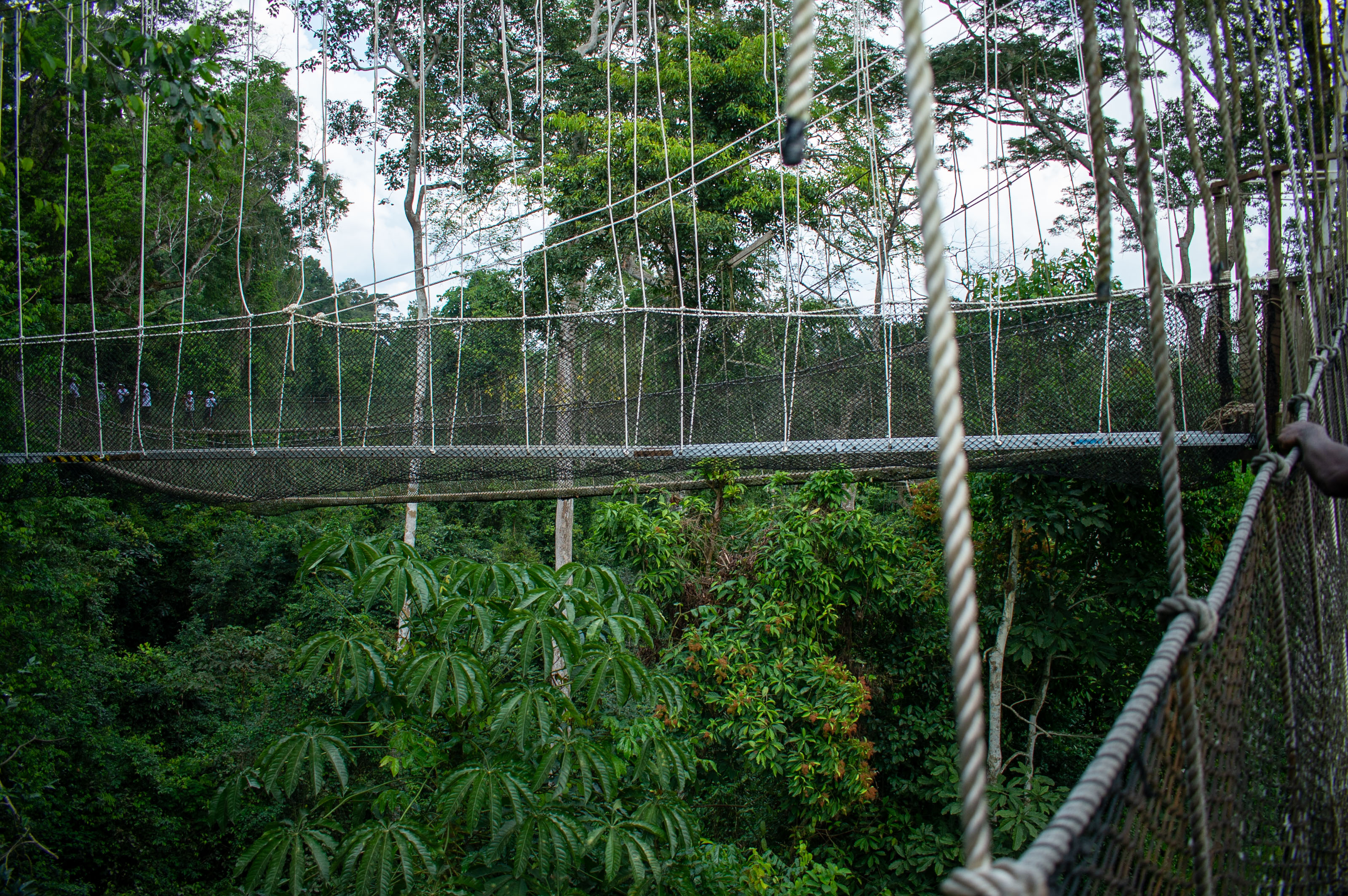
Canopy walkway

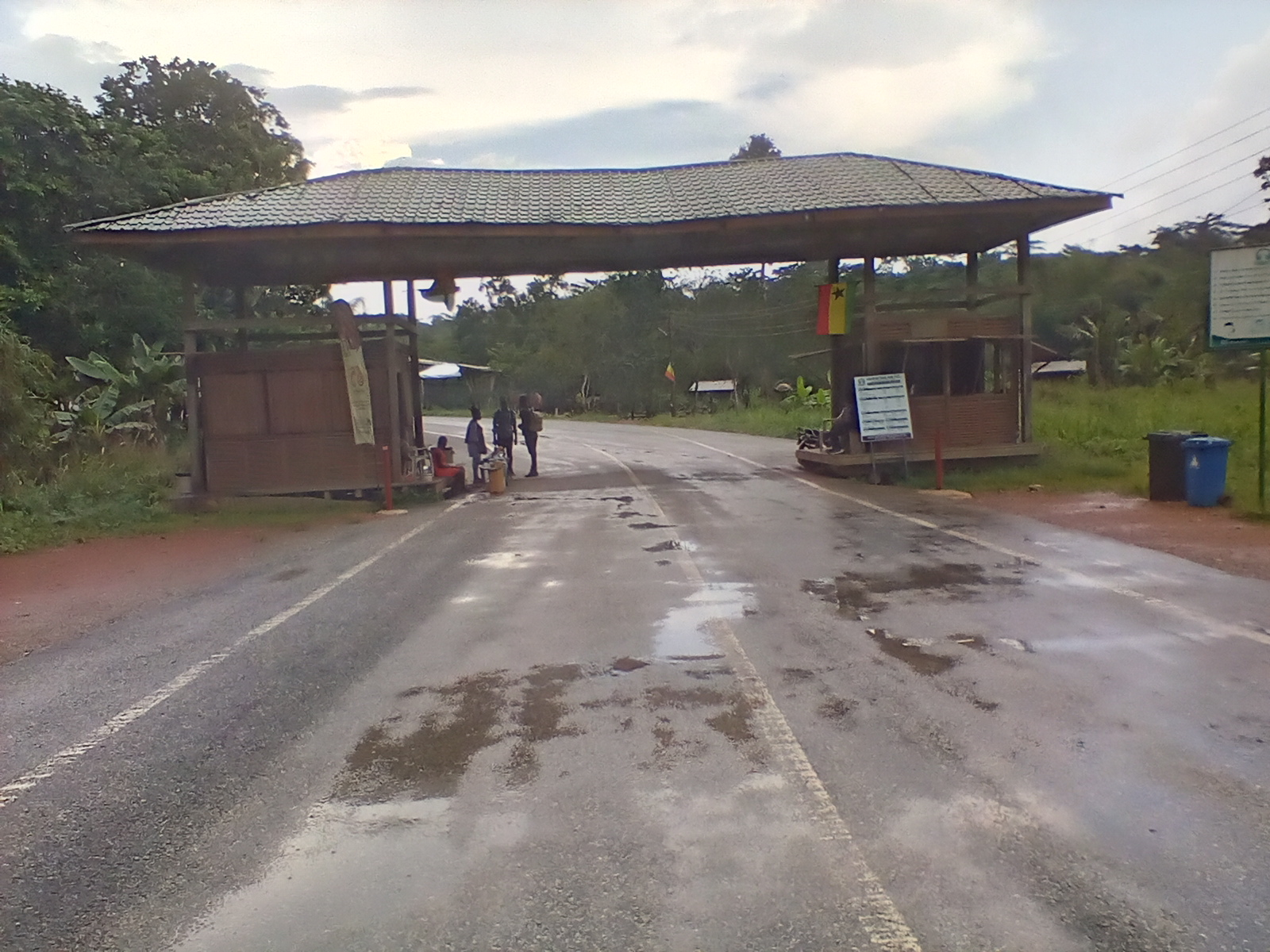
Entrance

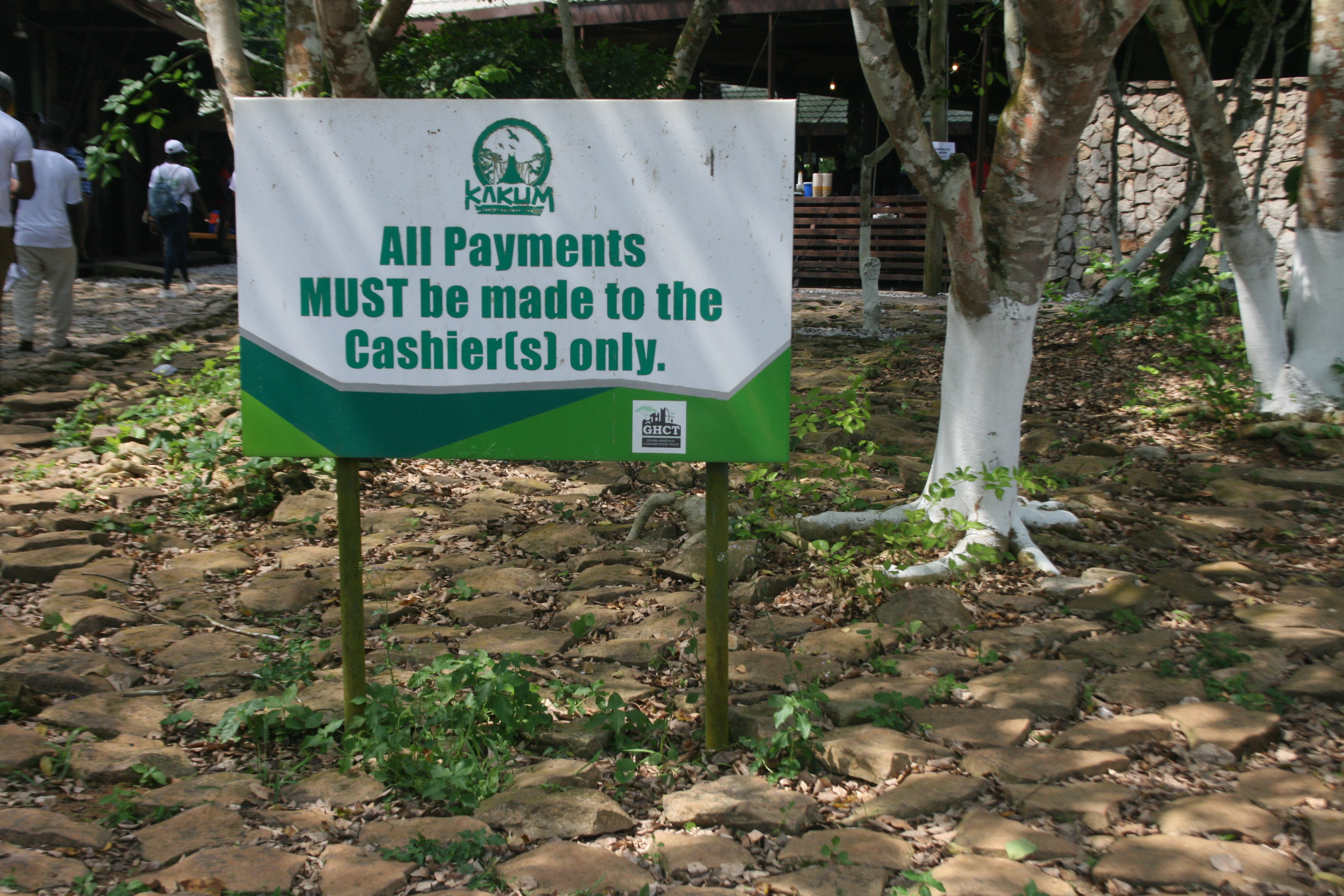
Sign post

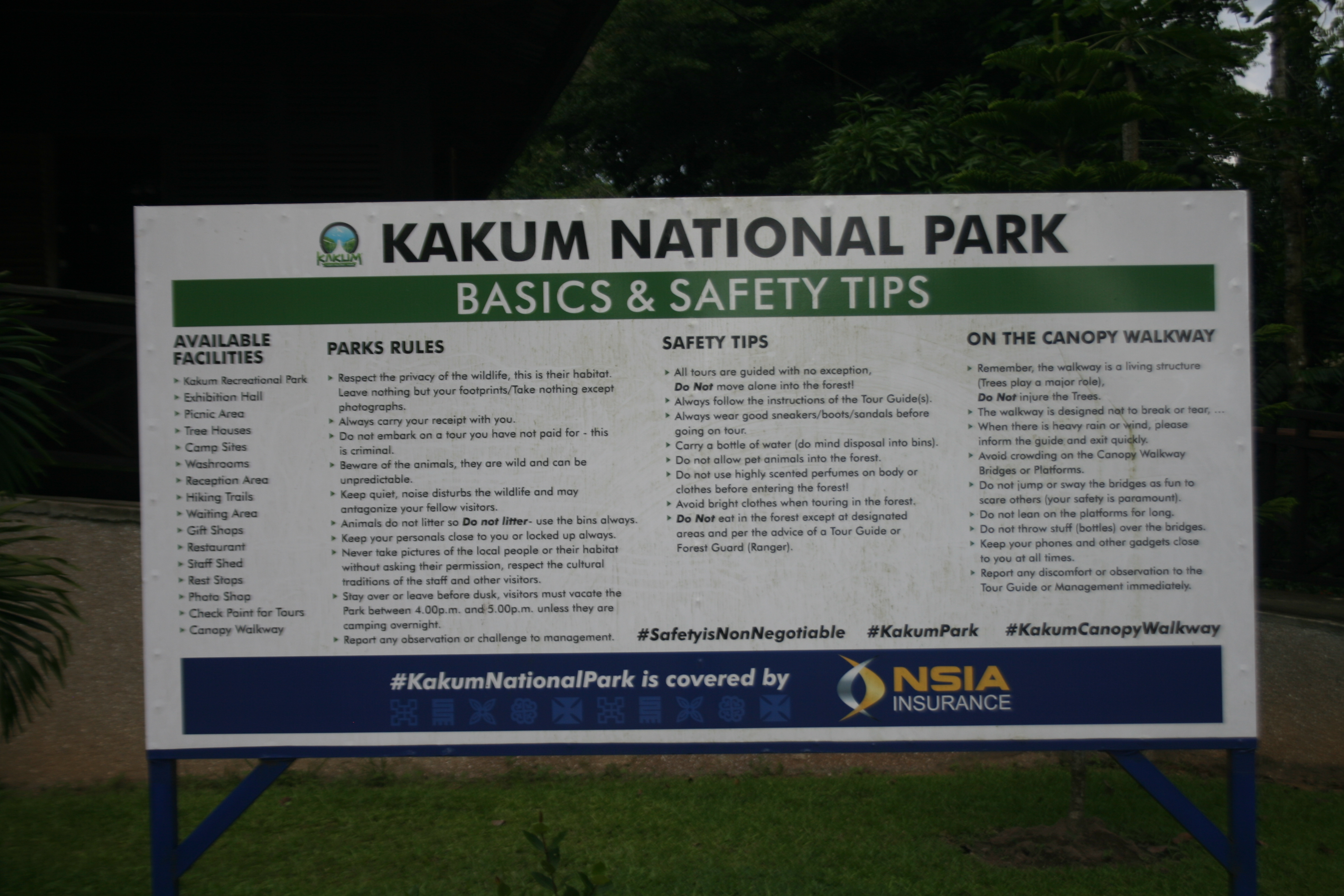
Safety tips

== See also ==
- Kakumdo
- Kakum River
