= Owabi River =

River in Ashanti Region, Ghana

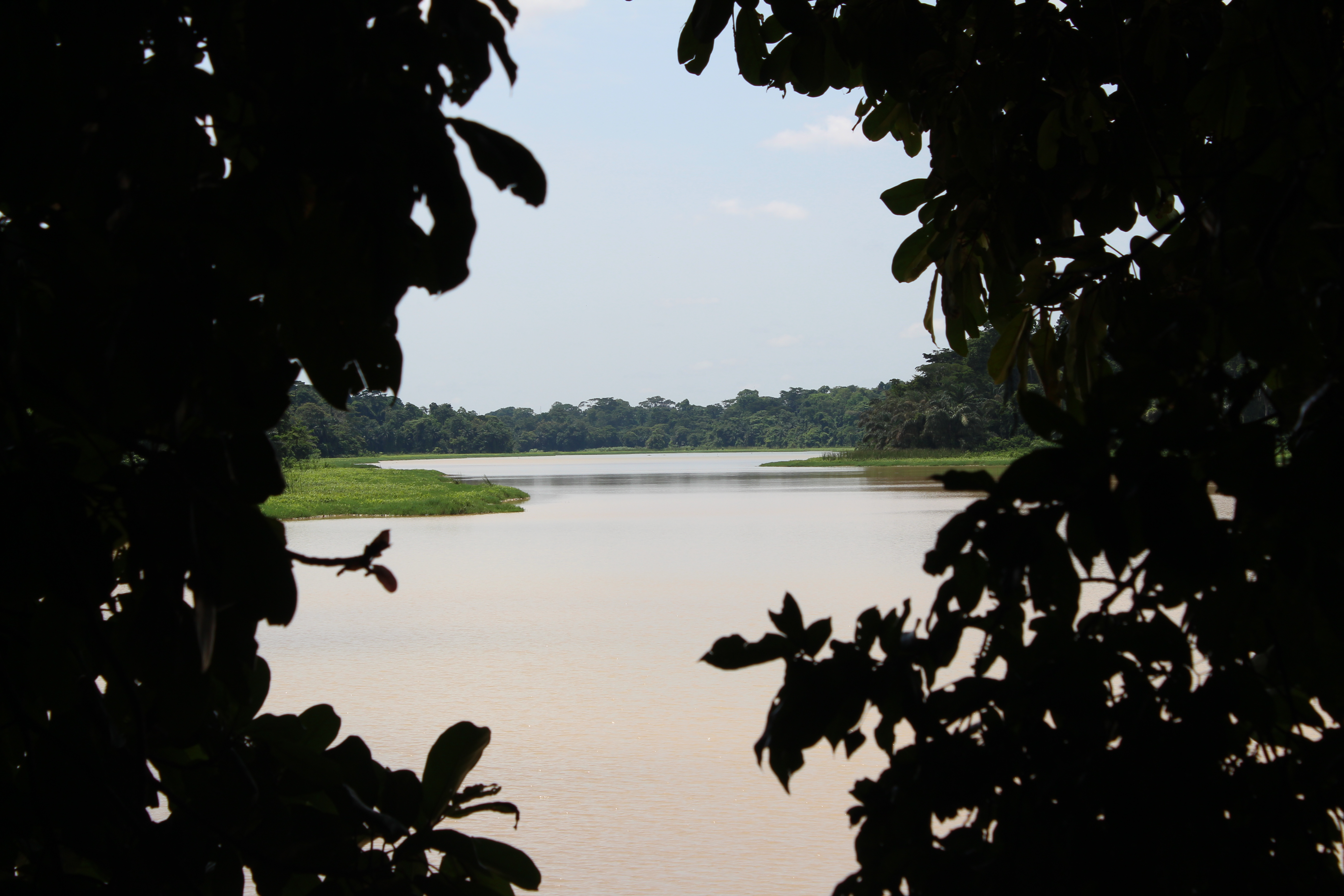

Location
- Countries: Ghana

Physical characteristics
- Mouth
  - coordinates: 6°44′N 1°41′E

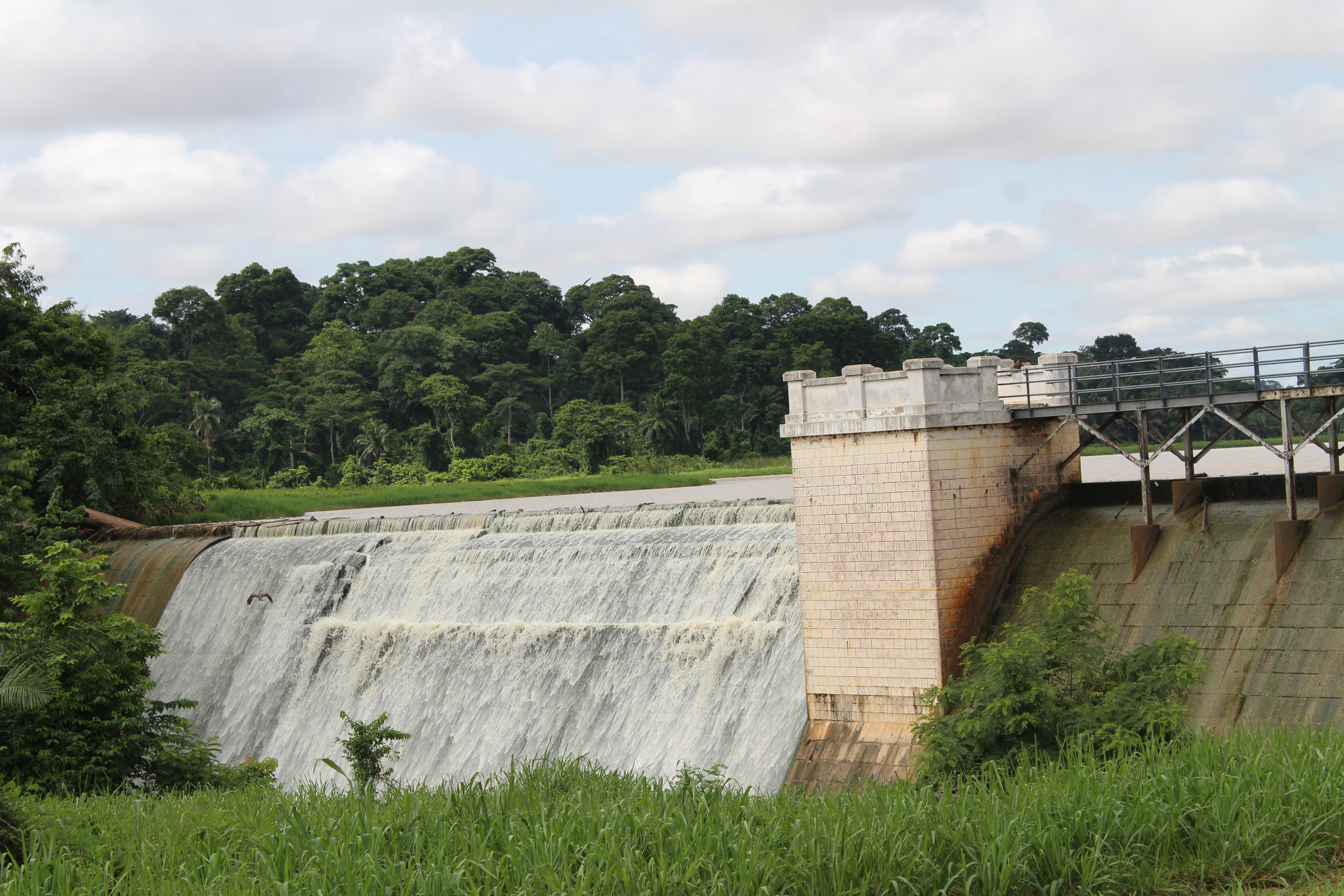
View of Owabi Ramsar Site and River

Owabi River is a river located in Owabi in the Atwima Nwabiagya South District in the Ashanti Region of Ghana. The Owabi Water Dam and Water Treatment plant is located on the river. Chiefs in Atafoa in the Kumasi Metropolis claimed there is a god in the river.

In October 2024, five people drowned in the river.

In November 2024, Nana Akufo-Addo commissioned a bridge over the river at Atafoa.

== See also ==
- Owabi Wildlife Sanctuary
