= Sarcophrynium villosum =

Conservation status
- Endangered (IUCN 3.1)

Scientific classification
- Kingdom: Plantae
- Clade: Tracheophytes
- Clade: Angiosperms
- Clade: Monocots
- Clade: Commelinids
- Order: Zingiberales
- Family: Marantaceae
- Genus: Sarcophrynium
- Species: S. villosum

Binomial name
- Sarcophrynium villosum (Benth.) K.Schum.

Synonyms
- Phyllodes villosa (Benth.) K.Schum; Phyllodes mollis Kuntze; Phrynium villosum Benth. in G.Bentham & J.D.Hooker

Species of flowering plant

Sarcophrynium villosum is a species of plant in the Marantaceae family. It is found in Cameroon and Gabon. Its natural habitat is subtropical or tropical moist lowland forests. It is threatened by habitat loss.
