= Mansonia gagei =

Scientific classification
- Kingdom: Plantae
- Clade: Embryophytes
- Clade: Tracheophytes
- Clade: Angiosperms
- Clade: Eudicots
- Clade: Rosids
- Order: Malvales
- Family: Malvaceae
- Genus: Mansonia
- Species: M. gagei

Binomial name
- Mansonia gagei J.R.Drumm.

Synonyms
- Burretiodendron umbellatum Kosterm.

Species of tree

Mansonia gagei is a species of flowering plant in the family Malvaceae. It is found in Southeast and South Asia.
