= Abrafo =

- Village
- Location in Ghana
- Coordinates: 5°20′N 1°23′W
- Country: Ghana
- Region: Central Region
- District: Twifo/Heman/Lower Denkyira District
- Elevation: 125 m (410 ft)
- Time zone: GMT
  - Summer (DST): GMT

Abrafo is a small village located in Twifo/Heman/Lower Denkyira District of the Central Region of Ghana about 30 kilometers north of Cape Coast.

== Geography ==
=== Location ===
Abrafo is situated at the entrance to Kakum National Park. The village is accessible by a paved road from Cape Coast.

== Economy ==
The village is mainly a small agricultural outpost, but at the border of the Kakum National Park there are several small restaurants and shops.

== See also ==
- Hemang Lower Denkyira (Ghana parliament constituency)
