= Kakum River =

River in Ghana

Coordinates: 5°05′50″N 1°19′18″W

The Kakum River is a water body located in Esuekyir, a suburb of Cape Coast in the Central Region of Ghana. The Kakum Conservation Area was named after the river. In 2013, the river was dredged to prevent flooding in the Kwaprow area. The river supplies water to Cape Coast and about 133 other towns and villages.
