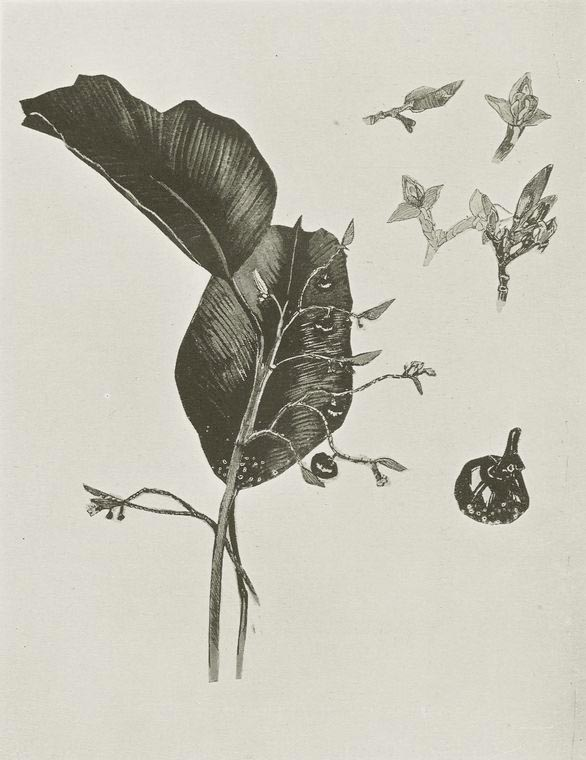
- Sarcophrynium from Liberia

Scientific classification
- Kingdom: Plantae
- Clade: Tracheophytes
- Clade: Angiosperms
- Clade: Monocots
- Clade: Commelinids
- Order: Zingiberales
- Family: Marantaceae
- Genus: Sarcophrynium; K.Schum.

= Sarcophrynium =

Genus of plants

Sarcophrynium is a genus of flowering plants in the family Marantaceae indigenous to tropical Africa. It was described as a genus in 1902.

In Cameroon, the leaves of Sarcophyrnium species are used to thatch huts. The fruits are also used as accessories.

Species

- Sarcophrynium bisubulatum (K.Schum.) K.Schum. in H.G.A.Engler (ed.) - Zaïre
- Sarcophrynium brachystachys (Benth.) K.Schum. in H.G.A.Engler (ed.) - C + W Africa
- Sarcophrynium congolense Loes. in G.W.J.Mildbraed (ed.) - Zaïre
- Sarcophrynium prionogonium (K.Schum.) K.Schum. in H.G.A.Engler (ed.) - C + W Africa
- Sarcophrynium schweinfurthianum (Kuntze) Milne-Redh. - C + E Africa
- Sarcophrynium villosum (Benth.) K.Schum. in H.G.A.Engler (ed.) - Gabon
