= Owabi Wildlife Sanctuary =

Park in Ghana

Coordinates: 6.751843°N 1.710017°W

Designations

Ramsar Wetland
- Official name: Owabi Wildlife Sanctuary Ramsar Site
- Designated: 22 February 1988
- Reference no.: 393

Owabi Wildlife Sanctuary is a bird sanctuary, located in Kumasi in the Ashanti Region of Ghana. It is home to many butterflies, over 140 species of birds, monkeys and the more reclusive bushpig, bushbuck and antelope.

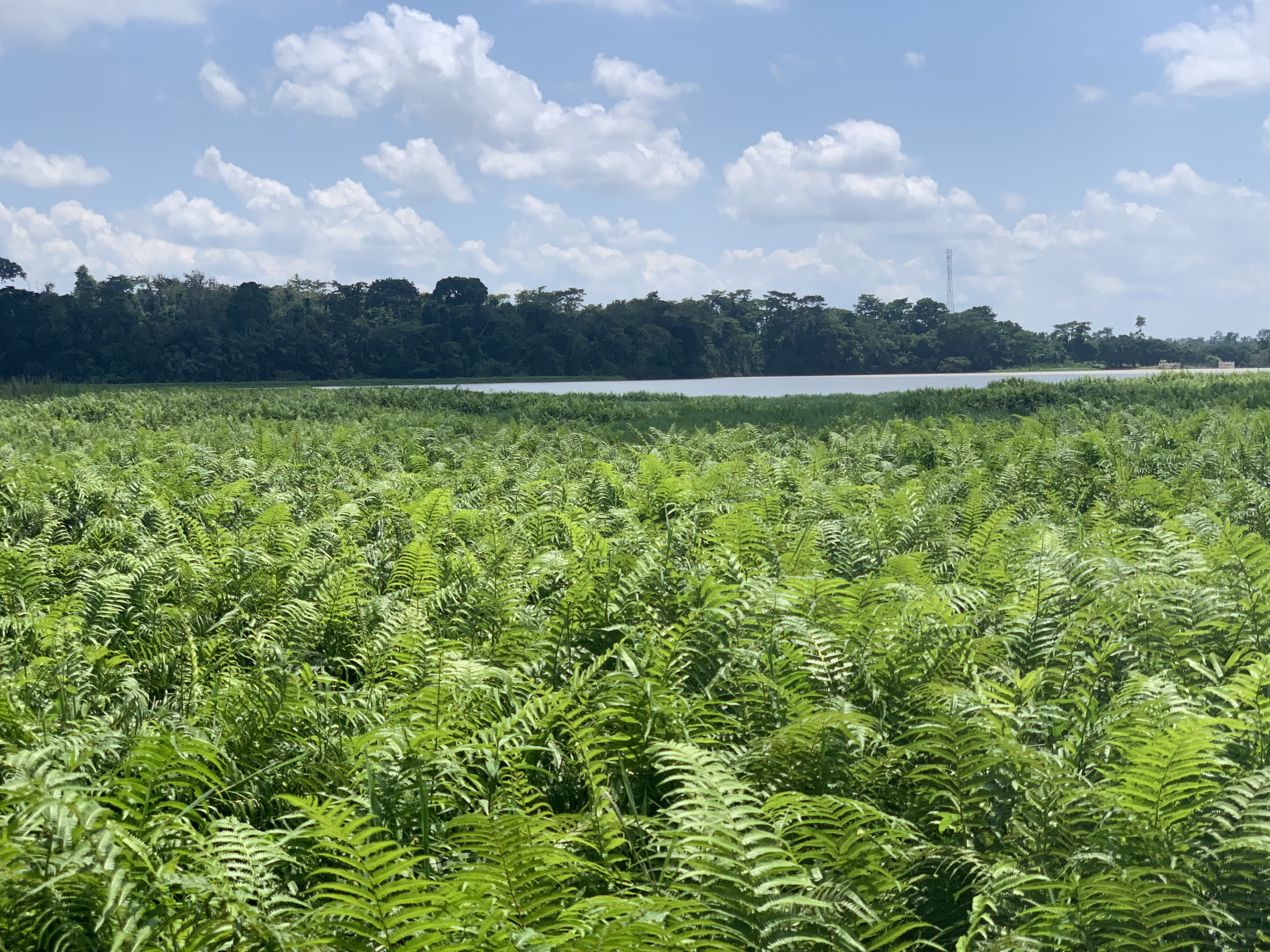
Owabi wildlife sanctuary.

The region is rich with indigenous birds and some migrants. There are about 161 kinds of birds. The sanctuary is also the only inland Ramsar site in Ghana. The site is suitable for picnicking and bird watching.

== See also ==
- Owabi River
