= Krokosua Hills Forest Reserve =

Forest reserve in Ghana

Coordinates: 6.56°N 2.73°W

- IUCN category V (protected landscape/seascape)

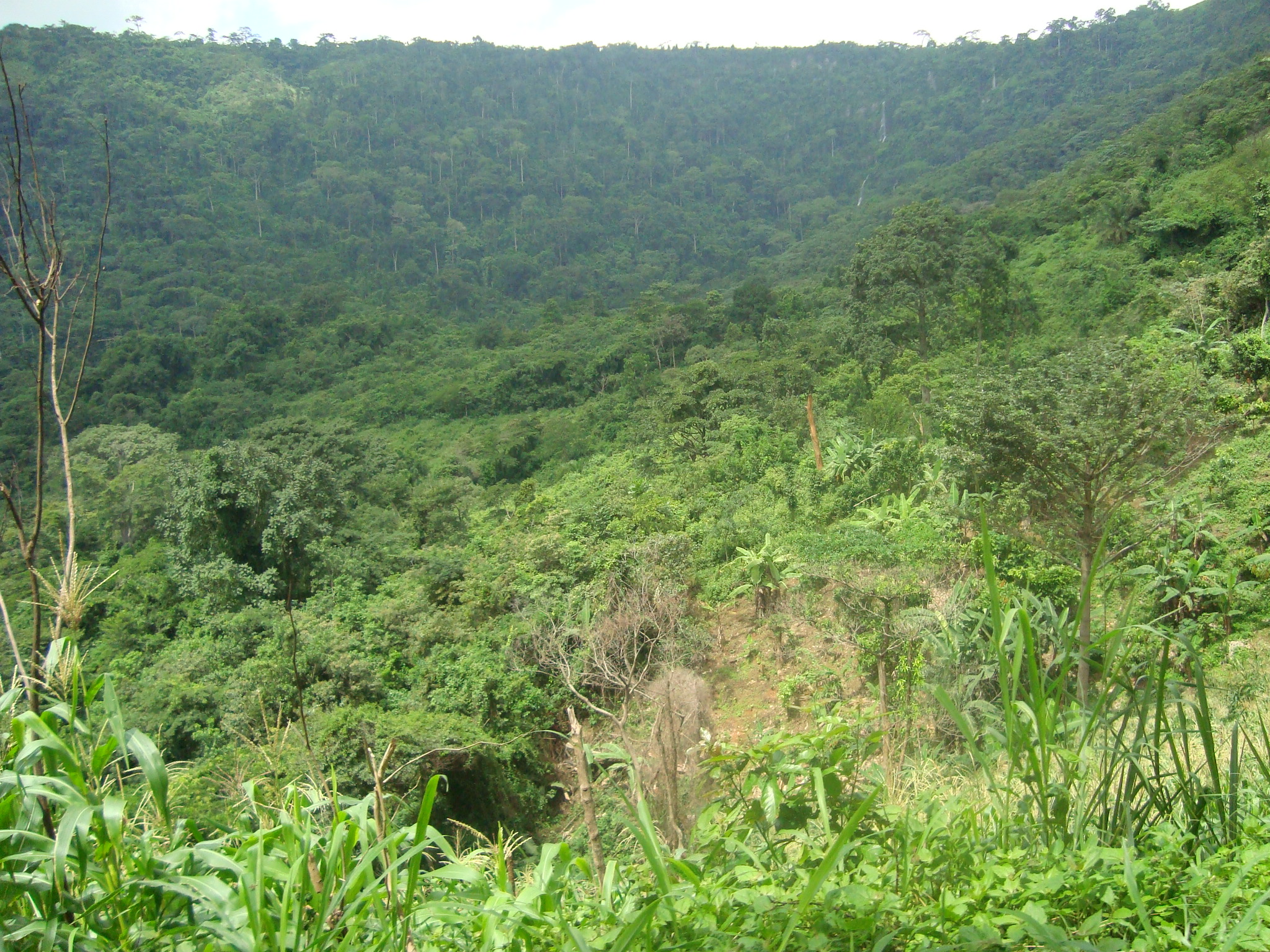
Krokosua Hills

The Krokosua Hills Forest Reserve is a 481 km^{2} (186 sq mi) forest reserve established in 1935 in Ghana.

== Ape status ==
The last estimate of chimpanzee abundance in Ghana was made by Teleki's in 1989, which estimated between 300 and 500 chimpanzees present. No evidence of chimpanzees presence was found at the site during field surveys, however their presence was reported by hunters (Magnuson, 2002; Oates, 2006).

This forest has been heavily logged in the past. Evidence of logging in progress was also seen during field surveys in 1995 (Oates, 2006). Evidence of hunting is high at this site. It was estimated to 5.2 hunting signs per hour of scouting survey (Oates, 2006).
