= Muni-Pomadze Ramsar Site =

Wetland in Ghana

- IUCN category II (national park)
- Location within Ghana Location within Africa
- Location: Central Region of Ghana
- Nearest city: Winneba
- Coordinates: 5°20′40″N 0°39′01″W
- Established: 1992

The Muni-Pomadze Ramsar Site is in Winneba, Ghana. The Muni-Pomadze Ramsar site was designated as a Ramsar site in 1992 and it included two forest reserves which is the Yenku A and B forest Reserves.it also includes is the catchment of three seasonal streams, the Pratu, the Boaku and the Muni, which drain into Muni Lagoon. The lagoon surrounds the floor plain and the adjacent sand beach. which constitute the southern part of the site.

== Geography and environment ==
Muni-Pomadze Ramsar Site is situated to the west of the coastal town of Winneba, approximately 55 km west of Accra. The Northern part of the site comprises two protected areas. Yenku A and B forest reserves cover 10% of the site, while the traditional hunting areas of the Efutu people make up another 15%. The surface area is about 300 ha.

The catchment is a gentle undulating plain bordered to the north and the north-east by the Yenku Hills (290 m) and in the south-west by the Egyasimanku Hills (205 m). The hill-slopes facing the lagoon are fairly steep. During the rains the lagoon fills up completely and spills over to flood the surrounding area about once every 10 years. Due to the rains, the villagers dig a canal to open an entrance to the sea and the excess water is released.

The lagoon shoreline is vegetated with Sesuvium portulacastrum, Pabulum vaginatum and Bosporus virginicus, successively, up the sides of the dunes. The dunes themselves are planted with coconut palms. The vegetation in the northern part of the wetland includes mangroves, with Typha australis, Ludwigia erecta and other typical freshwater hydrophytes occurring further inland. The vegetation in the upland areas is dominated by grassland and thickets, a eucalypt plantation, as well as forest vegetation in various stages of maturity.

The site has been designated an Important Bird Area (IBA) by BirdLife International because it supports significant populations of many bird species.

== Restoring Our Mangroves Muni-Pomadze Ramsar Site ==
Members of the two fishing communities, Nsuakyir and Warabeba, were inspired to restore degraded mangrove areas within the Muni-Pomadze Ramsar Site in Winneba, Central Region, Ghana. The Canadian Fund for Local Initiative (CFLI) funded for the mangrove seedlings (Rhizophora stylosa) which were planted at degraded sites at Muni Pomadze Ramsar site. During 2013-14, A Rocha Ghana worked with over 3,000 people from three adjacent communities to promote conservation and sustainable use of mangrove resources.
