= Tano Nimri Forest Reserve =

Forest reserve in Ghana

- Location within Ghana
- Location: South-western Ghana
- Coordinates: 05°37′59″N 02°37′00″W
- Area: 206 km^{2} (80 sq mi)
- Established: 1935

The Tano Nimri or Tano Nimiri Forest Reserve is found in south-western Ghana. It was established in 1935. It covers an area of 206 km^{2} (80 sq mi).

== Environment ==
The terrain between the Nimri and Tano rivers is rugged, characterised by steep slopes and valleys that flood during rainfall. The southern third is vegetated with wet evergreen forest; the rest with moist evergreen forest.

The reserve has been designated an Important Bird Area (IBA) by BirdLife International because it supports significant populations of many bird species.

It is thought that western chimpanzees are present in the reserve (Magnuson et al., 2003).
