= Sarcophrynium brachystachys =

Scientific classification
- Kingdom: Plantae
- Clade: Tracheophytes
- Clade: Angiosperms
- Clade: Monocots
- Clade: Commelinids
- Order: Zingiberales
- Family: Marantaceae
- Genus: Sarcophrynium
- Species: S. brachystachys

Binomial name
- Sarcophrynium brachystachys (Benth.) K.Schum.

Species of flowering plant

Sarcophrynium brachystachys is a rhizomatous plant in the Marantaceae family native to the tropics of western Africa. It has dark green leaves and red fruits. The flowers may be cream, yellowish or pinkish white.

== Uses ==
Sarcophrynium brachystachys has various uses. In Cameroon, the leaves of S. brachystachys are used to wrap food. The plant is used medicinally in Gabon, Ghana, and the Ivory Coast. In Nigeria, it is used for ritual purposes. Sarcophrynium brachystachys is also grown as an ornamental.
