= Draw River Forest Reserve =

Forest reserve in Ghana

Coordinates: 5.2°N 2.3°W

- IUCN category V (protected landscape/seascape)

The Draw River Forest Reserve is found in Ghana. It was established in 1937, and covers 235 km^{2} (91 sq mi). The Draw River flows through the eastern part of the reserve. It lies at an elevation of 75 m above sea level.

== Environment ==
The reserve has been designated an Important Bird Area (IBA) by BirdLife International because it supports significant populations of many bird species.
