= Ayum Forest Reserve =

Forest reserve in Ghana

- IUCN category V (protected landscape/seascape)

The Ayum Forest Reserve is found in the Asunafo South District in the Ahafo Region of Ghana. It was established in 1940. This site is 112 km^{2}.

It is connected to the Subim Reserve and the Bonsam Bepo Reserve, and together they cover about 488 square kilometers. It plays a key role in conserving biodiversity in Guinean Moist Forest Eco-Region. The area contains a small number of chimpanzees, elephants and other endangered species and snails, nuts, fuelwoods.
