= Bonsam Bepo Forest Reserve =

Forest reserve in Ghana

Coordinates: 6.6504°N 2.6666°W

- IUCN category V (protected landscape/seascape)
- Interactive map of Bonsam Bepo Forest Reserve

The Bonsam Bepo Forest Reserve is located at Ahantamo near Akrodie in the Ahafo Region of Ghana. It was established in 1934, and covers 124.00 km^{2} (47.88 sq mi).

It is located at an altitude of 304 m (997 ft).
