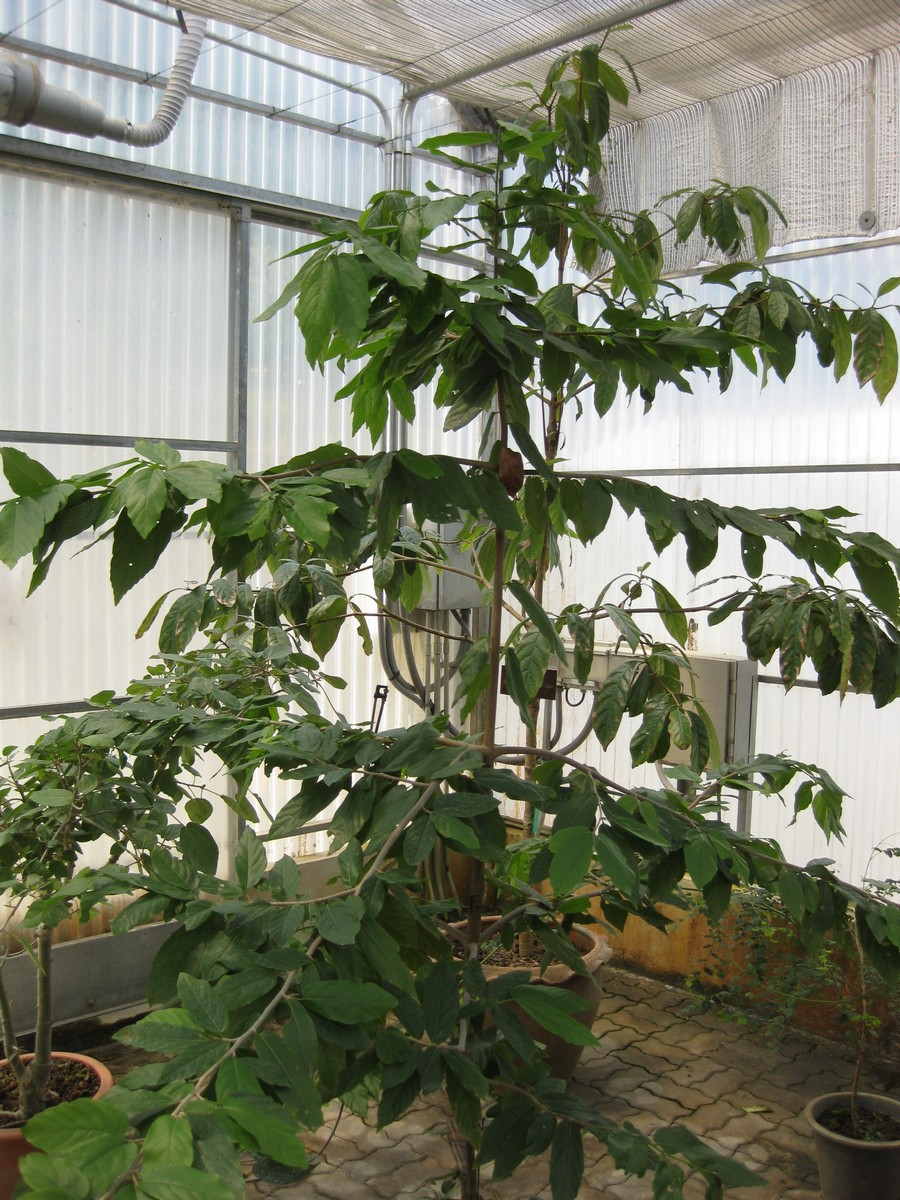
- Mansonia gagei

Scientific classification
- Kingdom: Plantae
- Clade: Tracheophytes
- Clade: Angiosperms
- Clade: Eudicots
- Clade: Rosids
- Order: Malvales
- Family: Malvaceae
- Tribe: Helictereae
- Genus: Mansonia; J.R.Drumm.

Species
- Mansonia altissima (A.Chev.) A.Chev.; Mansonia diatomanthera Brenan; Mansonia dipikae Purkay.; Mansonia gagei J.R.Drumm.; Mansonia nymphaeifolia Mildbr.

Synonyms
- Achantia A.Chev.

= Mansonia (plant) =

Genus of plants

Mansonia is a genus of flowering plants. It includes five species of large evergreen or deciduous trees. The species are native to tropical Africa and southeastern Asia.

== Distribution ==
There are three African species. Mansonia altissima ranges across west-central Africa, including parts of Benin, Cameroon, Central African Republic, Republic of the Congo, Ghana, Ivory Coast, Liberia, Nigeria, and Togo. M. nymphaeifolia is native to Cameroon. M. diatomanthera is native to northwestern Tanzania.

The Asian species are M. dipikae, which is native to the Indian states of Assam and Arunachal Pradesh in the eastern Himalayas, and M. gagei which lives in Myanmar, Laos, and Thailand.

The genus is named for Francis Bruce Manson (c. 1850 – 1908), a plant collector in Burma (present-day Myanmar) with the Indian Forest Service.
