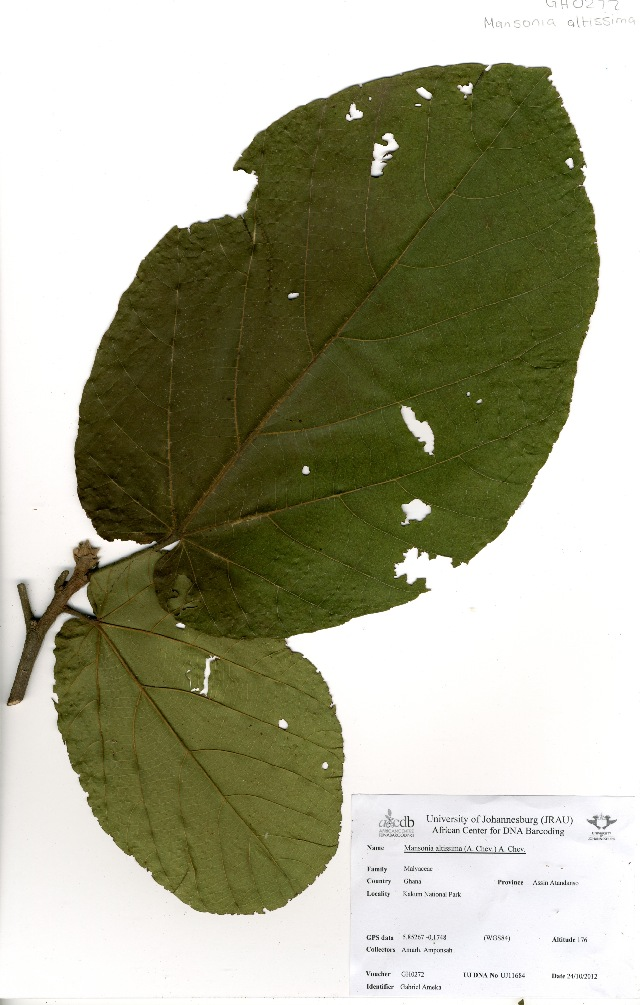

Conservation status
- Least Concern (IUCN 3.1)

Scientific classification
- Kingdom: Plantae
- Clade: Tracheophytes
- Clade: Angiosperms
- Clade: Eudicots
- Clade: Rosids
- Order: Malvales
- Family: Malvaceae
- Genus: Mansonia
- Species: M. altissima

Binomial name
- Mansonia altissima (A.Chev.) A.Chev.

Subspecies
- Mansonia altissima var. altissima; Mansonia altissima var. kamerunia Jacq.-Fél.
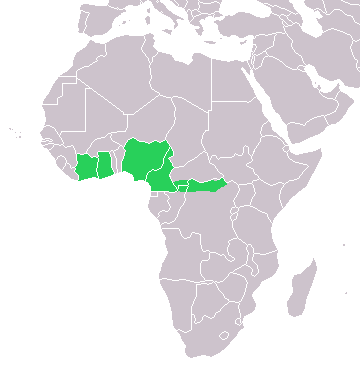
- Range of Mansonia altissima

Synonyms
- Achantia altissima A.Chev.

= Mansonia altissima =

Species of plant

Mansonia altissima is a species of tree native to western and Central Africa. It has the vernacular names of; African black walnut or African walnut.

== Distribution ==
Mansonia altissima ranges across west-central Africa, including parts of Benin, Cameroon, Central African Republic, Republic of the Congo, Ghana, Ivory Coast, Liberia, Nigeria, and Togo.

A subspecies, Mansonia altissima var. altissima, is native to disturbed areas and forest clearings in lowland moist forests. Its range includes portions of Côte d'Ivoire, Ghana, Benin, Nigeria, Cameroon, and Republic of the Congo. It is experiencing habitat loss and fragmentation across its range, and is considered Endangered.

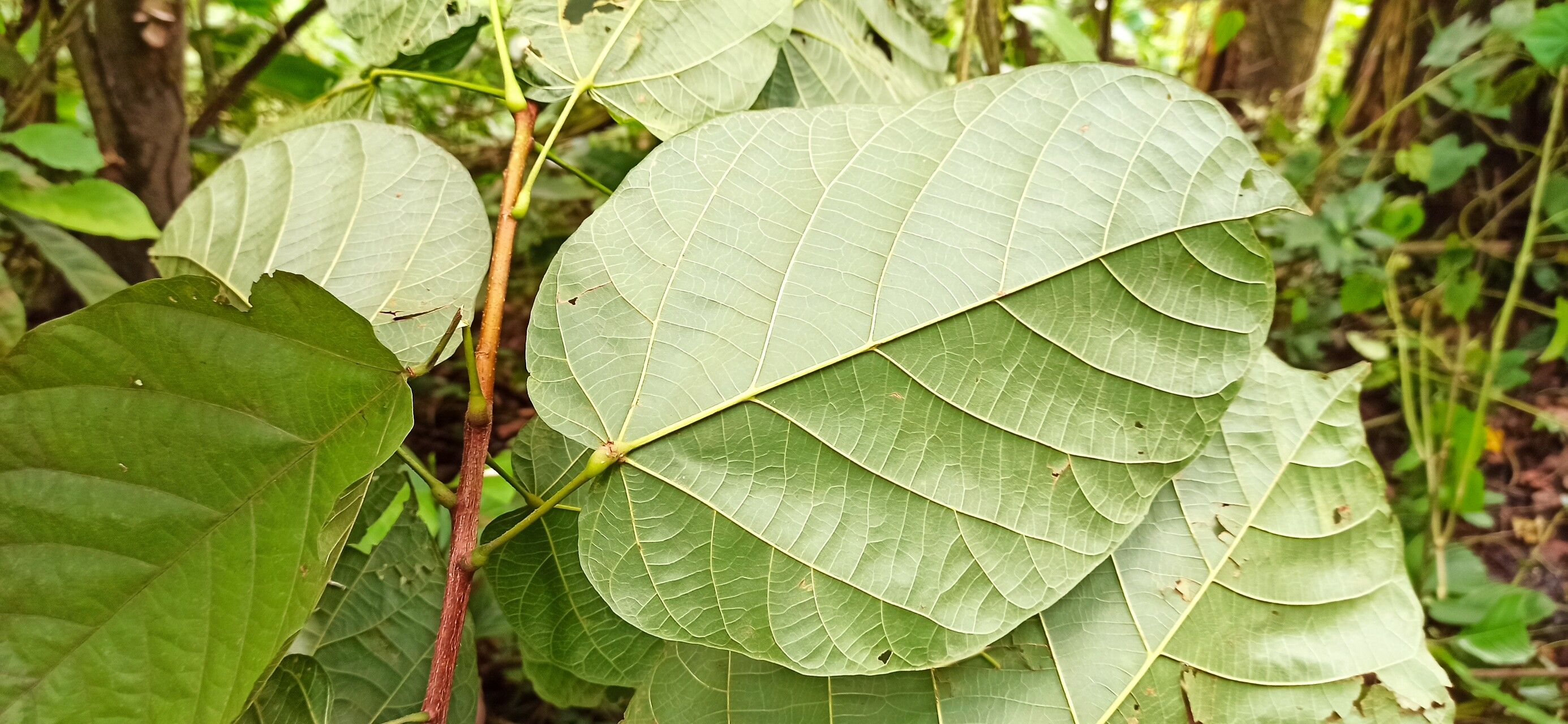
Mansonia altissima
