= Mamiri Forest Reserve =

Forest reserve in Ghana

- IUCN category V (protected landscape/seascape)
- Location within Ghana
- Location: Western Region, Ghana
- Nearest city: Pensamon
- Coordinates: 5°39′40″N 2°22′41″W
- Area: 45 km^{2} (17 mi^{2})
- Established: 1949

The Mamiri Forest Reserve is found in Ghana. It was established in 1949.

== Geography ==
The site covers 45 km^{2} (17 mi^{2}). It has a long, narrow shape, extending for about 15 km (9.3 mi) from north to south, and only 2–4 km (1.2–2.5 mi) from east to west (Oates, 2006). Mamiri lies on the boundary between the wet evergreen and moist evergreen forest zones (Hall and Swaine, 1981). The terrain is hilly, with the hills strongly dissected by steep-sided deep valleys. These valleys become flooded during the rainy season, creating swampy habitats. The reserve lies at an elevation of about 128 m above sea level.

=== Wildlife ===
The reserve has been designated an Important Bird Area (IBA) by BirdLife International because it supports significant populations of many bird species.

==== Chimpanzees ====
There are no recent estimates of western chimpanzee abundance in Ghana. The last estimate was made by Teleki (1989), which estimated between 300 and 500 chimpanzees to be present in Ghana. The chimpanzee's presence was confirmed during field surveys in 2005 at this site (Oates, 2006). However, subsequent surveys in 2009 failed to confirm their survival. (Gatti, 2009).
