= Assin-Attandanso Game Production Reserve =

The Assin-Attandanso Game Production Reserve is a protected area in Ghana falling in IUCN Category VI. It was established in 1991. The area of the site is 139.86 square kilometres (54.00 sq mi).
