= Biodiversity of Ghana =

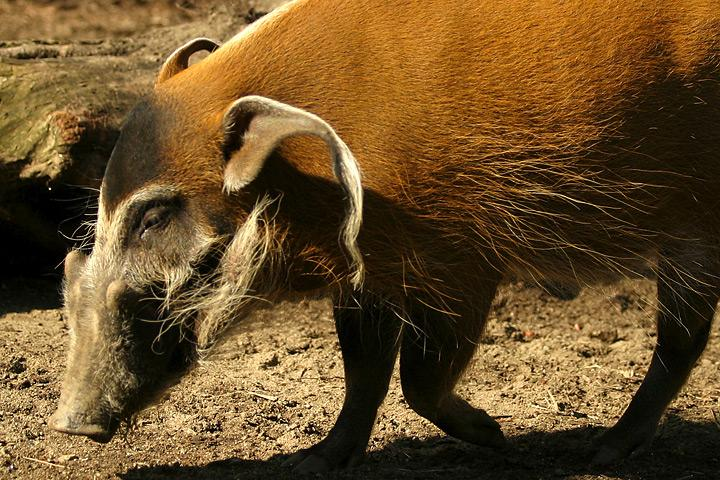
Red river hog

The wildlife of Ghana is composed of its biodiversity of fungi, flora and fauna.

== Biodiversity ==
=== Fungi ===
Ghana is home to a significant number of fungi species including: Aspergillus flavus; Athelia rolfsii; Auricularia auricula-judae; Curvularia; Fusarium oxysporum; Fusarium solani f.sp. pisi; Gibberella intricans; Gibberella stilboides; and Macrophomina phaseolina. The true total number of fungal species occurring in Ghana is in the thousands and given the generally accepted estimate that only about 7 percent of all fungi worldwide have so far been discovered and that the amount of available information is still very small.

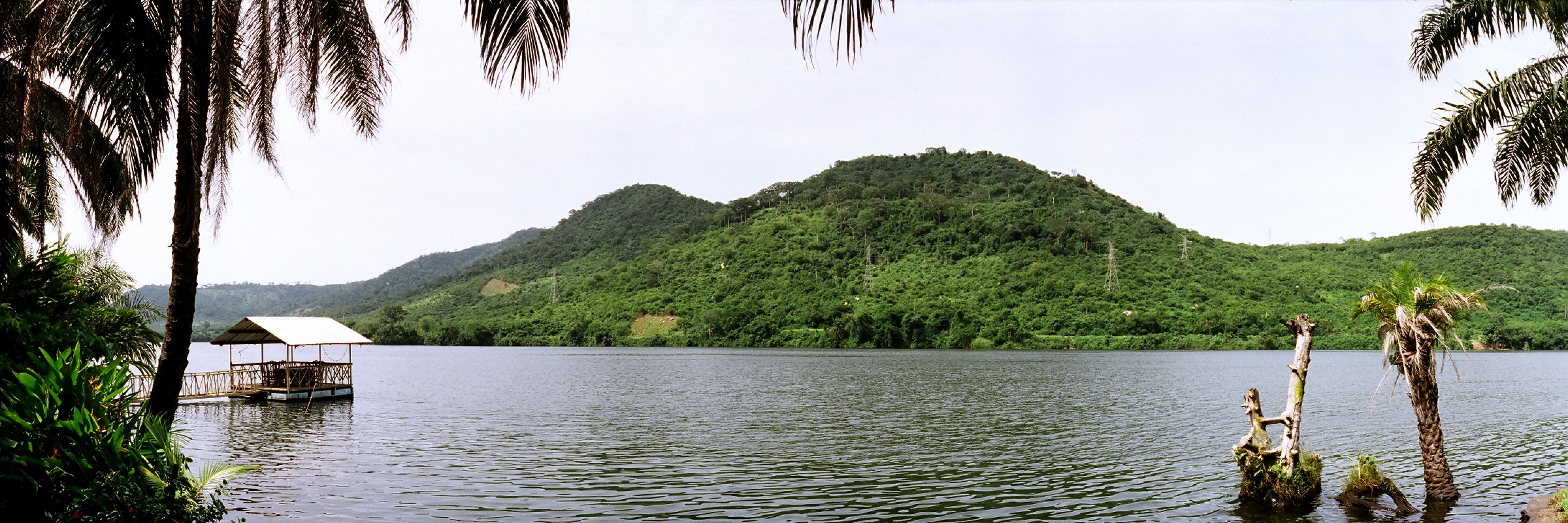
Panorama and landscape view of Lake Volta in the Volta Basin; the largest lake and reservoir by surface area in the world. Lake Volta contains an array of fungi species and flows into the Gulf of Guinea on the Atlantic Ocean. Lake Volta has three main tributaries: the Black Volta; the White Volta and the Red Volta.

=== Flora ===
The flora of Ghana is diverse with both indigenous and introduced floral species considered in Ghana's floral diversity. A total of some 3,600 species of the major regional centres of endemism represent the three major taxonomic groups. Floral diversity is more pronounced among the angiosperms represented with well over 2,974 indigenous and 253 introduced species in Ghana. Among the various vegetation types of the tropical rain forest, it is the wet evergreen forest type in the southwestern Ashanti-Kwahu Plain that exhibits the highest level of endemism and species richness in Ghana.

Flora species diversity and endemism in the savanna biomes in Ghana is very sparse and biological diversity of species in the Ghanaian savanna woodlands and gallery forests of the savannas show greater species richness than the dry savannas. Within Ghana, there are areas of high biological diversity, referred to as prime biological locations; such as the Ankasa and Nini-Suhien Conservation Area in the southwestern Ashanti-Kwahu erea terrestrial plain of Ghana, in where the climatic diversity is greater. There are also Encephalartos barteri, and gymnosperm indigenous to Ghana; others growing in various Ghanaian ecological zones are introduced species for purposes including aesthetics and economic. The third taxonomic group; pteridophytes, is well represented in Ghana with 124 known species.

Flora of Ghana

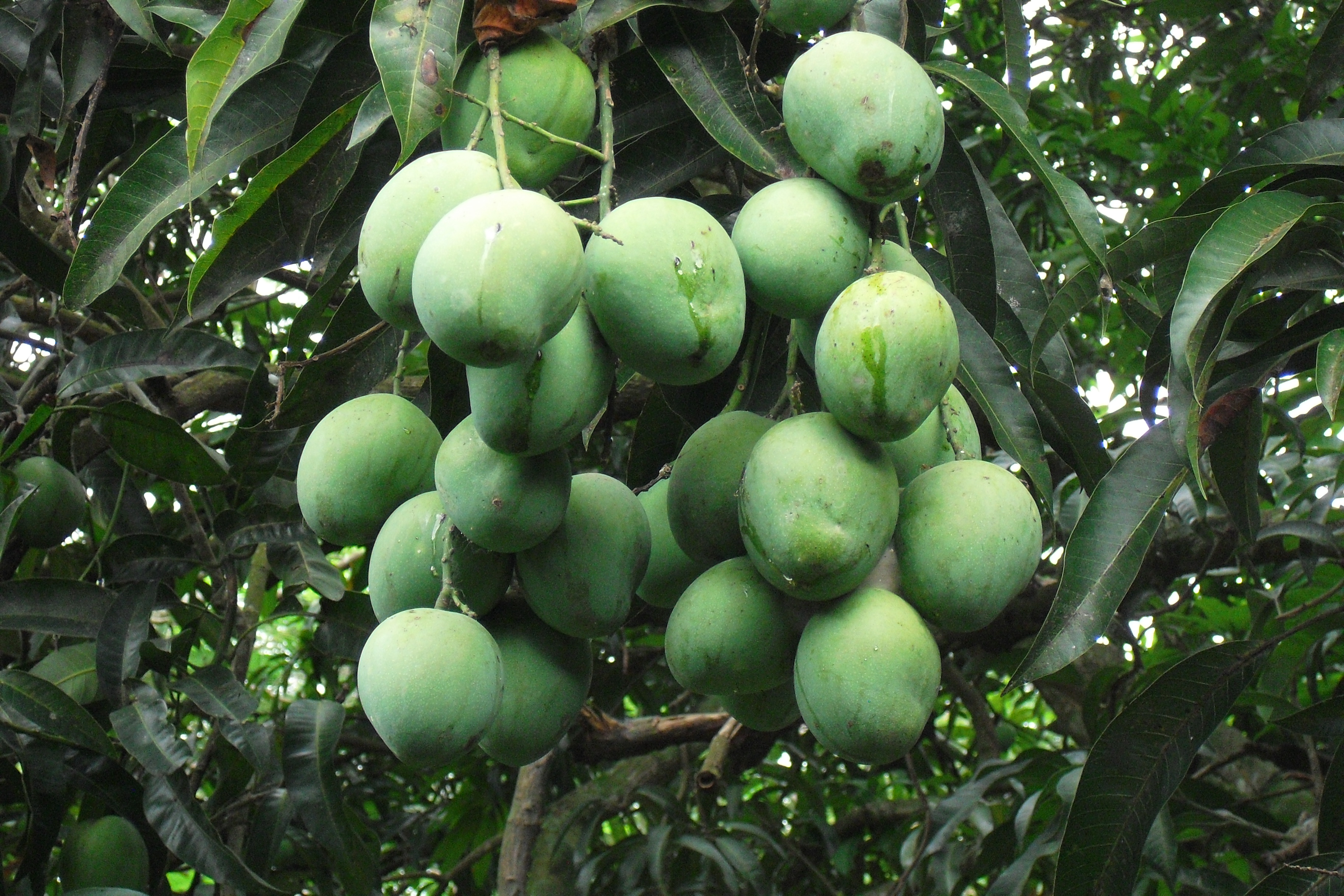
Mangifera

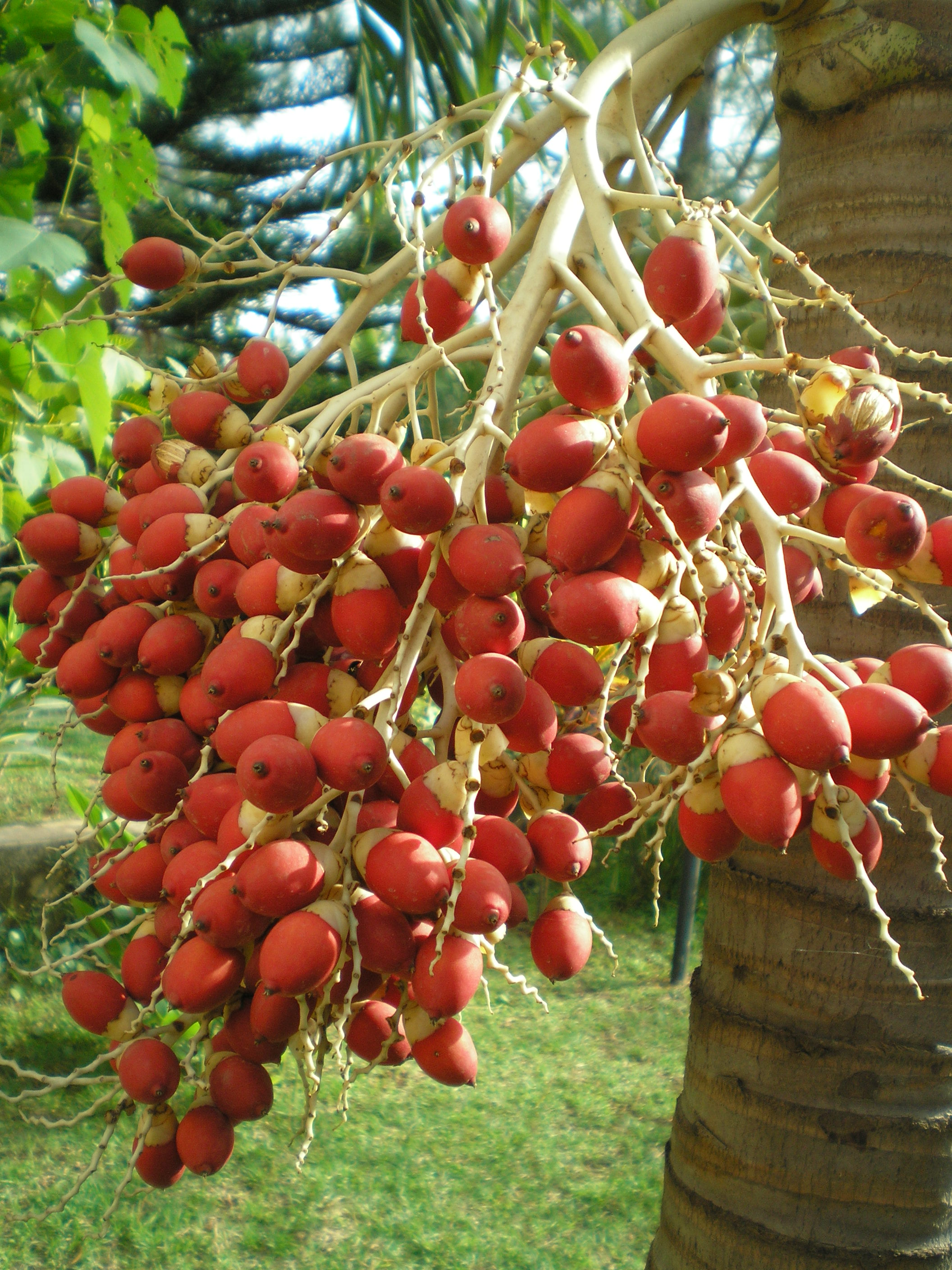
Adonidia merrillii

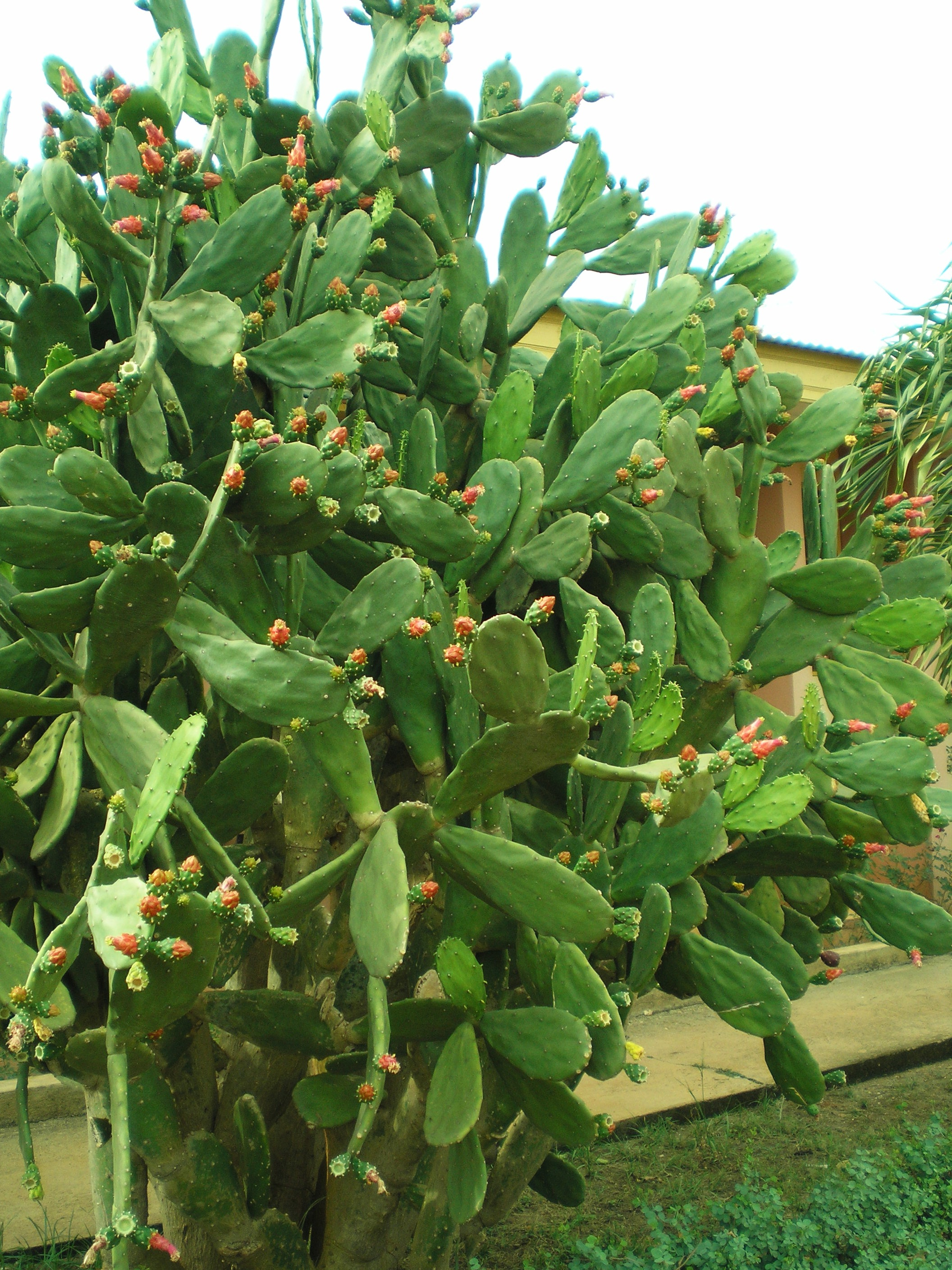
Opuntia cochenillifera

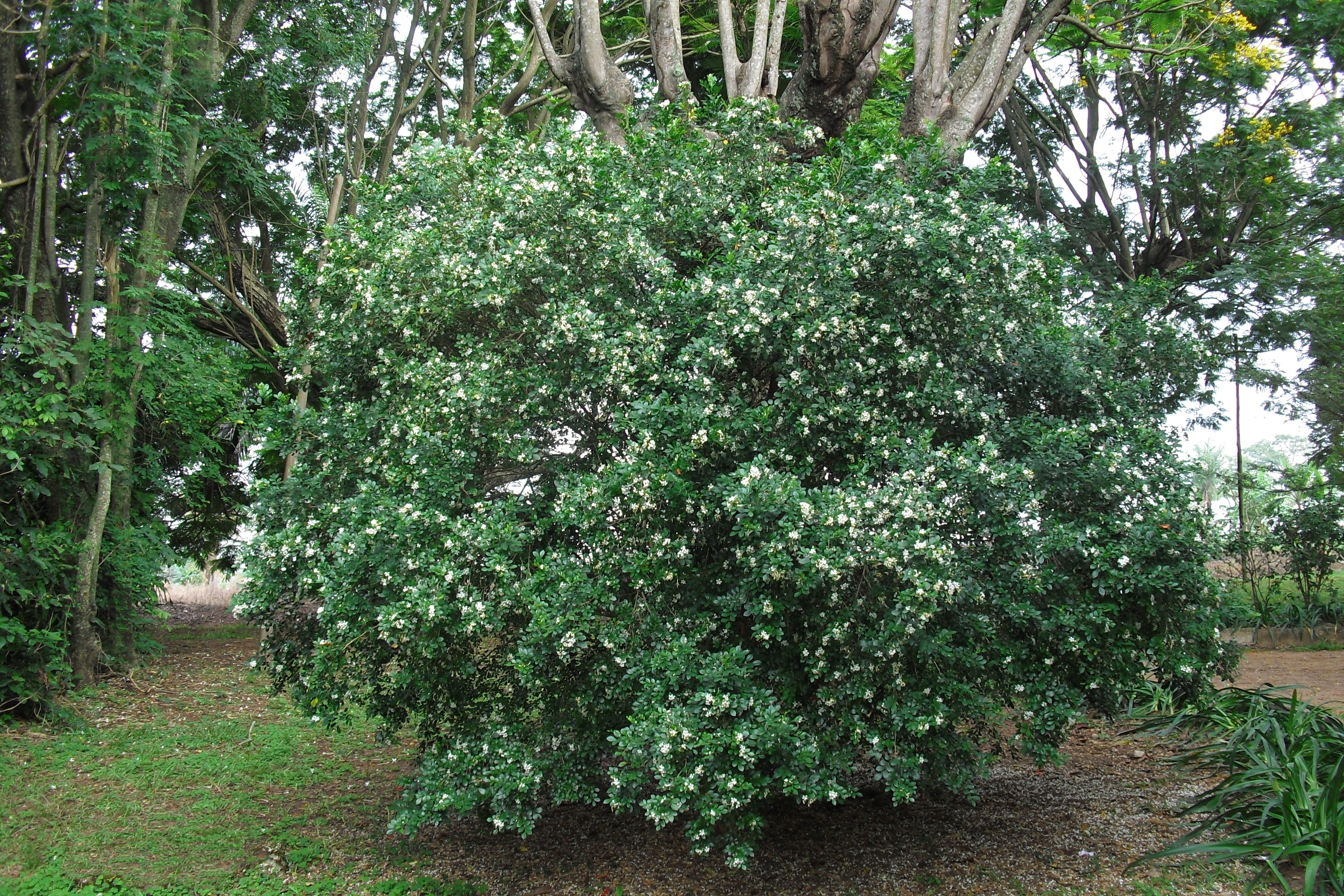
Murraya paniculata

==== Fauna ====
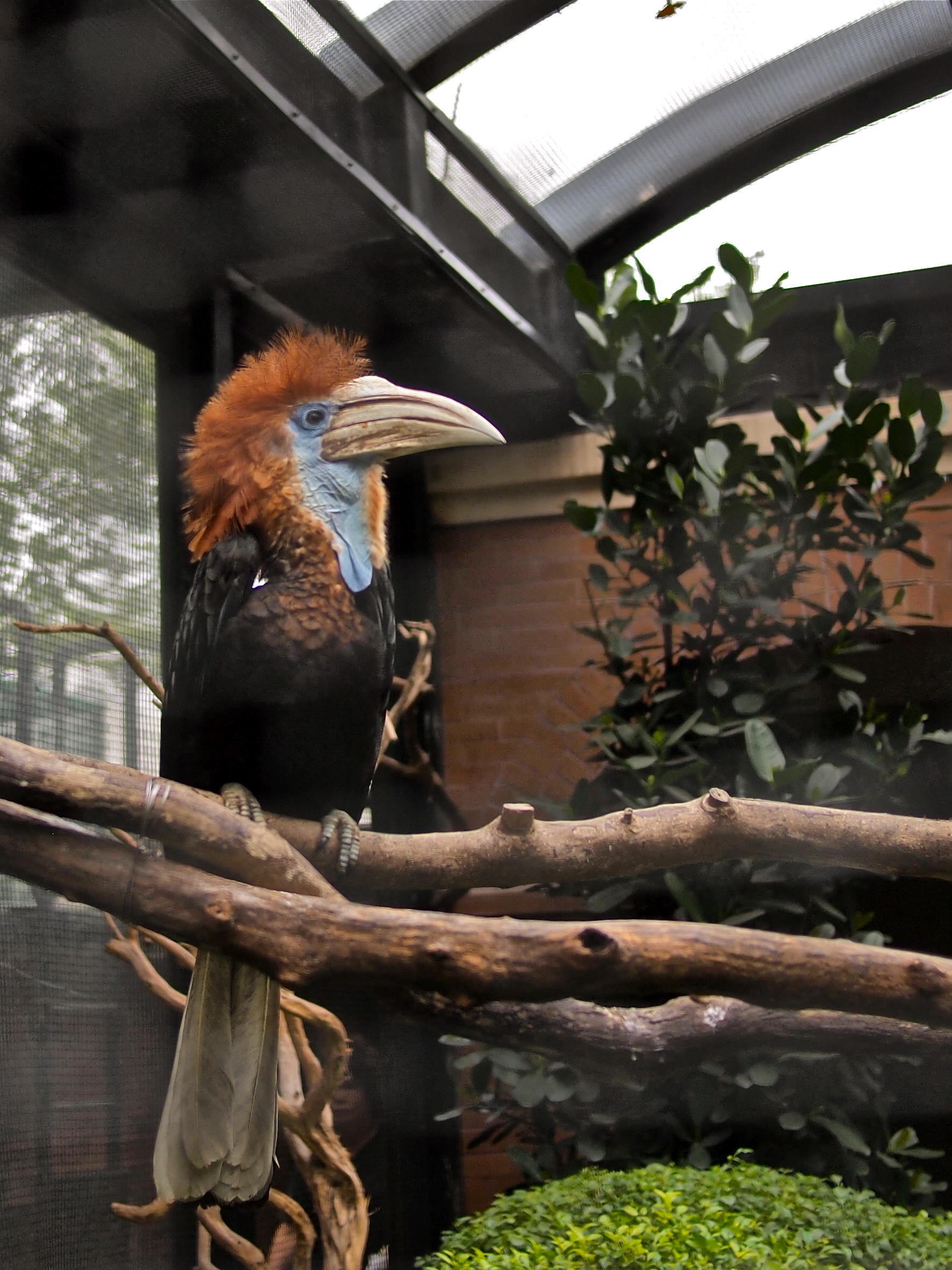
Yellow-casqued wattled hornbill

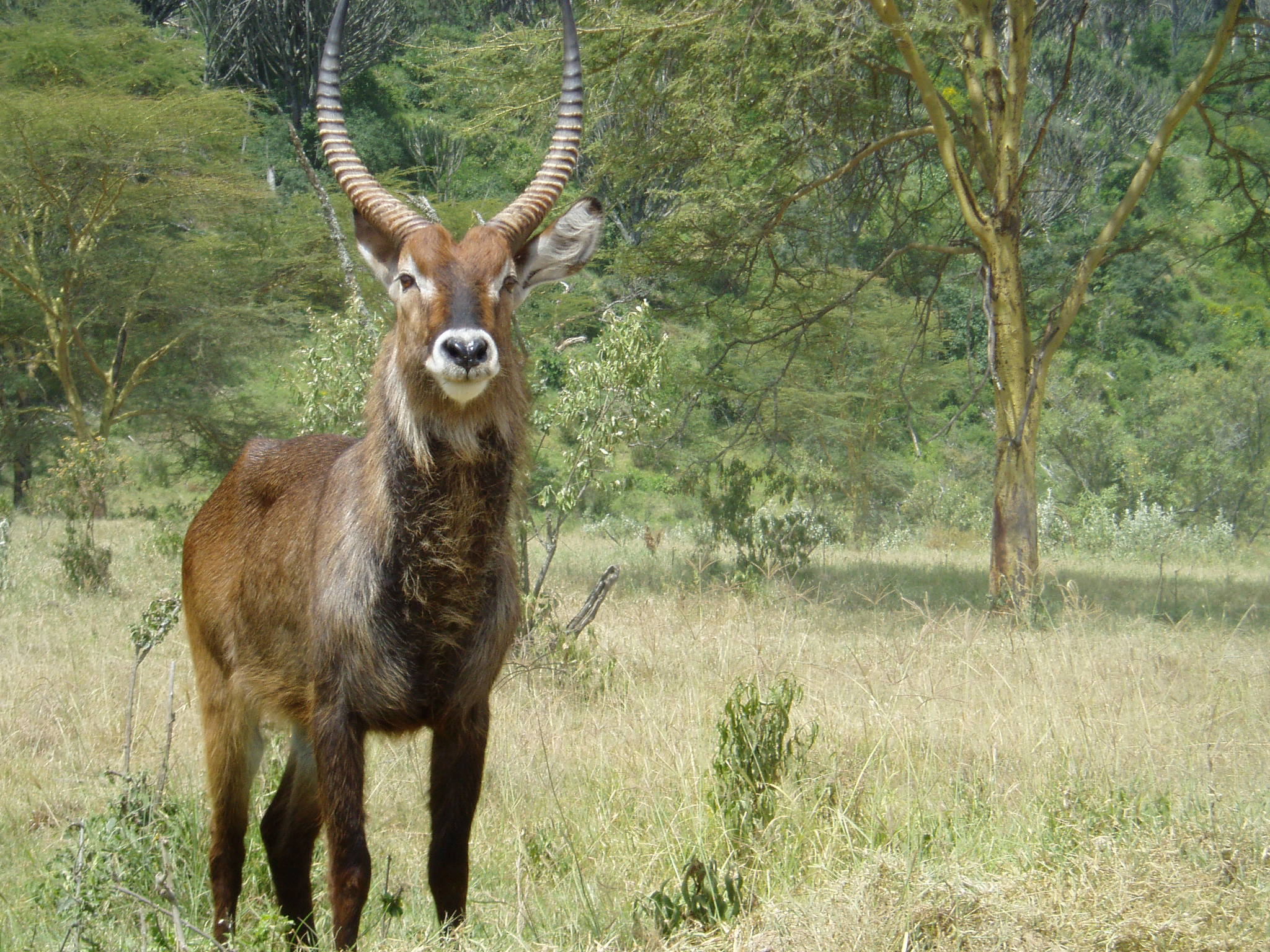
Kobus ellipsiprymnus

Ghana has a vast array of fauna and they are of great significance, as some of Ghana's fauna have attained conservation status because of the current rate of decline in their number and distribution. The fauna of the Ghanaian terrestrial ecosystem, comprise a diverse array of species including several of conservation concern. Ghanaian records show that there is as many as 221 species of amphibians and reptiles, 724 species of birds, 225 mammalian species inhabiting Ghana; with 93 recorded to be inhabiting the Ghanaian savanna ecological zone. As with floral diversity, prime locations for faunal diversity is located in the Ghanaian high forest uplands; accounting for 83% of the total number of butterfly species recorded in Ghana, where canopy stratification and micro-climatic differentiation have provided habitats and niches for specific faunal organisms.

Endemism among Ghanaian terrestrial fauna has been observed in three species of frogs; Hyperolius baumanni; Hyperolius fusciventris; and Hyperolius sylvaticus; and the lizards; and Agama sylvanus found in the Ghanaian Bia Forest Reserve and the Atwema Range Forest Reserve. Ghana has a high degree of butterfly endemism where more than 20 species are classified endemic or near-endemic. Ghana is home to 84 known amphibian species: 78 frogs, 5 toads and caecilians. Threatened species recorded in Ghana include four species of marine turtles and three species of crocodiles. Bird species of conservation concern include seven threatened species, including four species endemic to the Upper Guinea forest block and seven near-threatened species.

Keystone species such as hornbills, parrots and birds of prey (eagles) are well represented in Ghana. Of the 728 birds species confirmed to be occurring in Ghana; 408 are non-passerines and 320 passerines, of which 498 are known or thought to be resident and 176 are regular seasonal bird migrants, including 100 from the Palearctic realm. Of the total number of species occurring; 180 restricted to the Guinea-Congo forests biome and 37 restricted to the Sudan-Guinea savanna biome have been recorded in Ghana. Eleven of the 15 endemic bird species within the Upper Guinea forest occur in Ghana. Six of the total species are considered threatened and 12 are near-threatened.

Ghana is an important country for dozens of vulnerable, threatened, endangered, critically endangered or near-extinct mammalian species including the primates common chimpanzee (Pan troglodytes) and western red colobus (Piliocolobus badius), the big cats lion (Panthera leo) and leopard (Panthera pardus), African bush elephant (Loxodonta africana), and water-birds, being located on the boundary of the east Atlantic Ocean Flyway and Mediterranean Flyway. There are also several rare terrestrial birds, such as the white-necked rockfowl (Picathartes gymnocephalus).

Fauna of Ghana
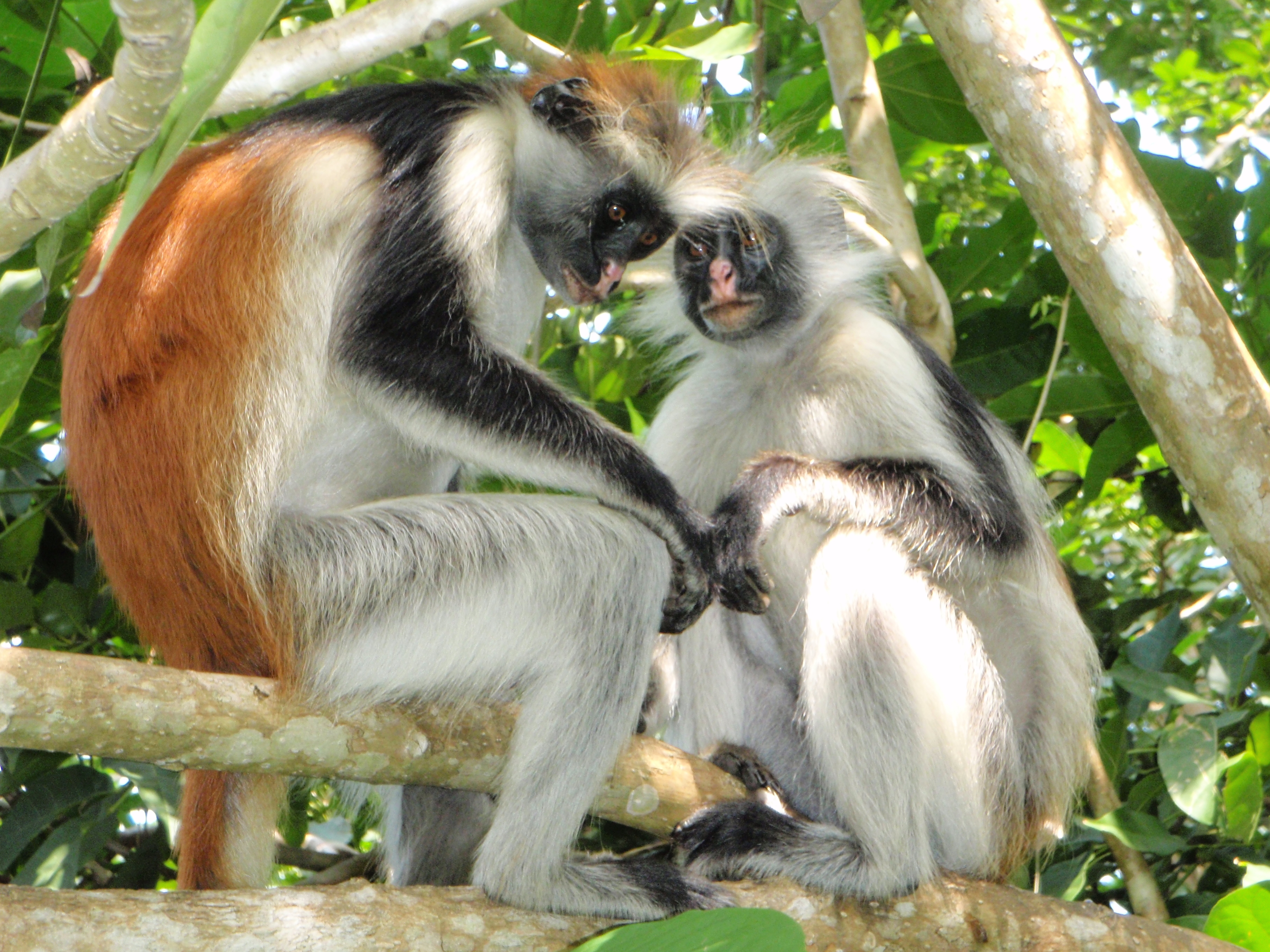

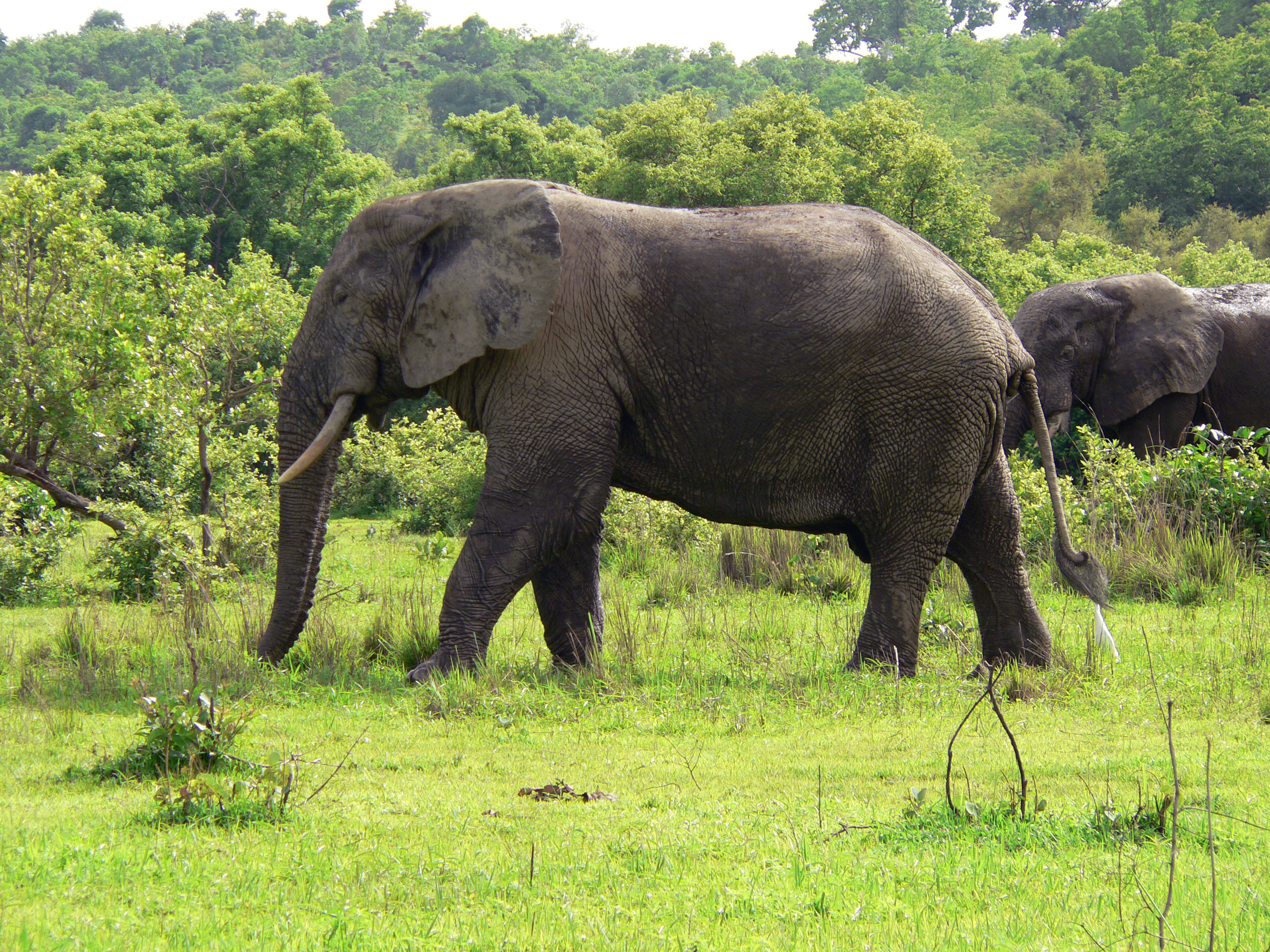
Loxodonta africana

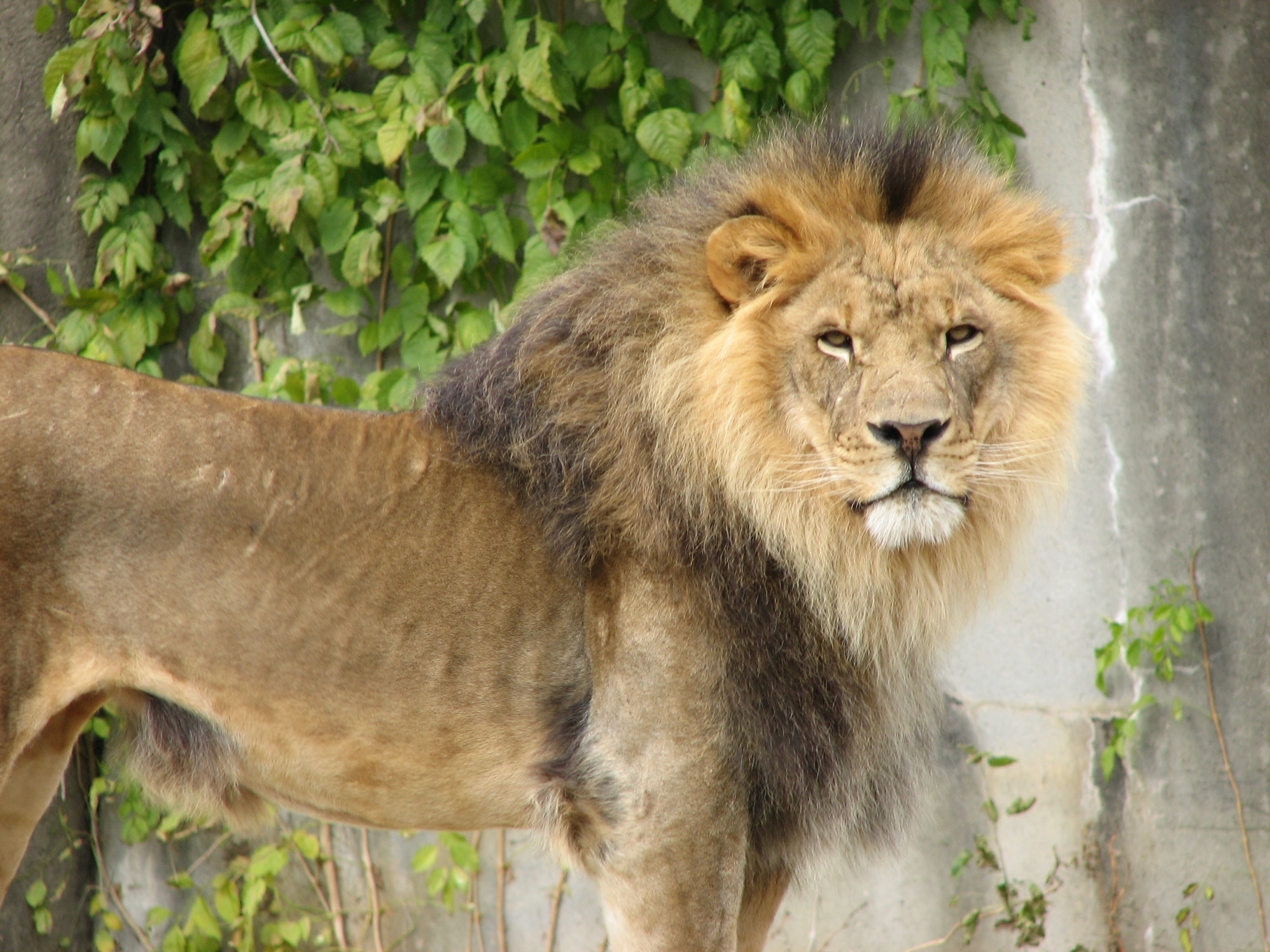
Panthera leo

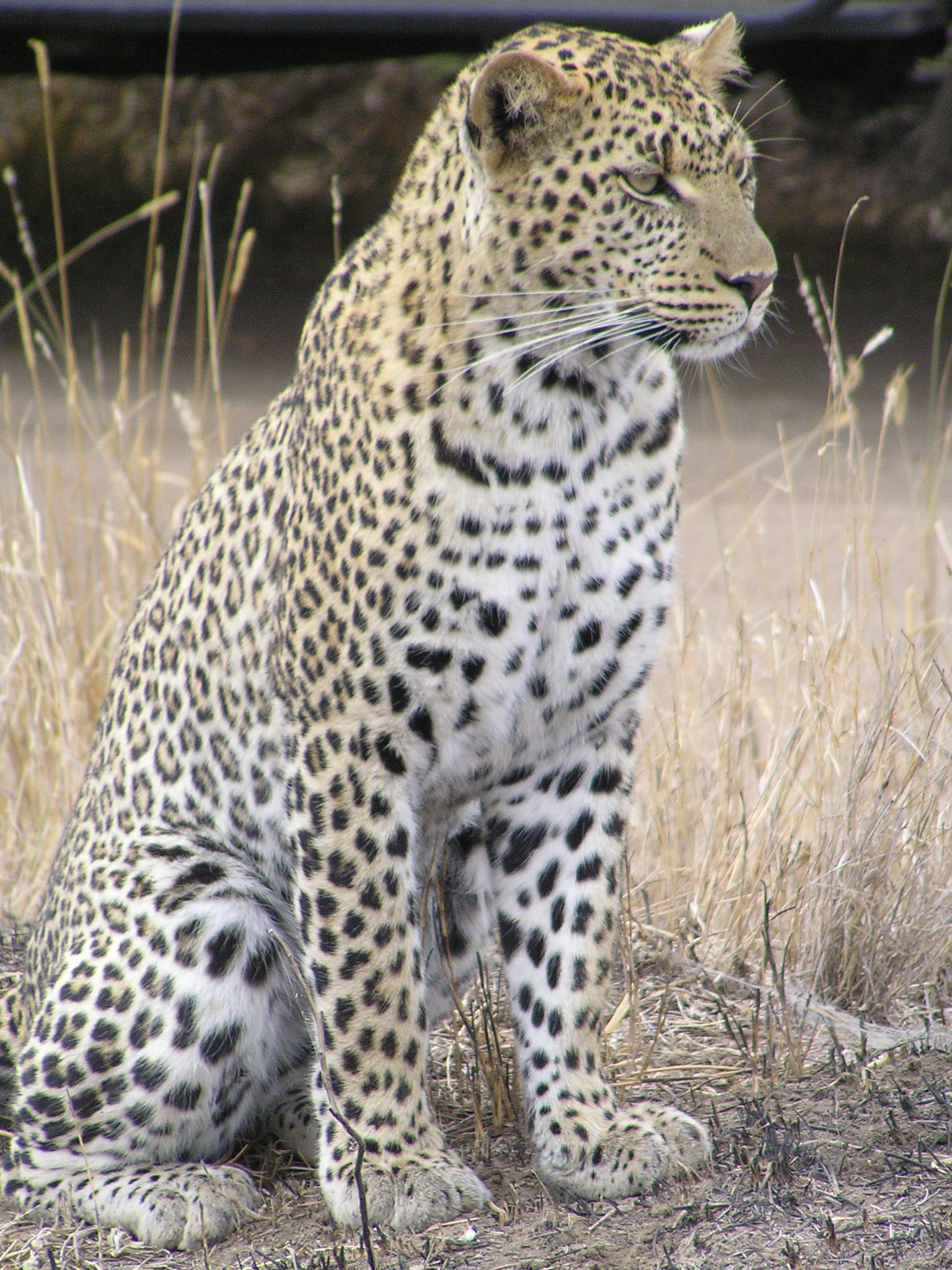
Panthera pardus paridus

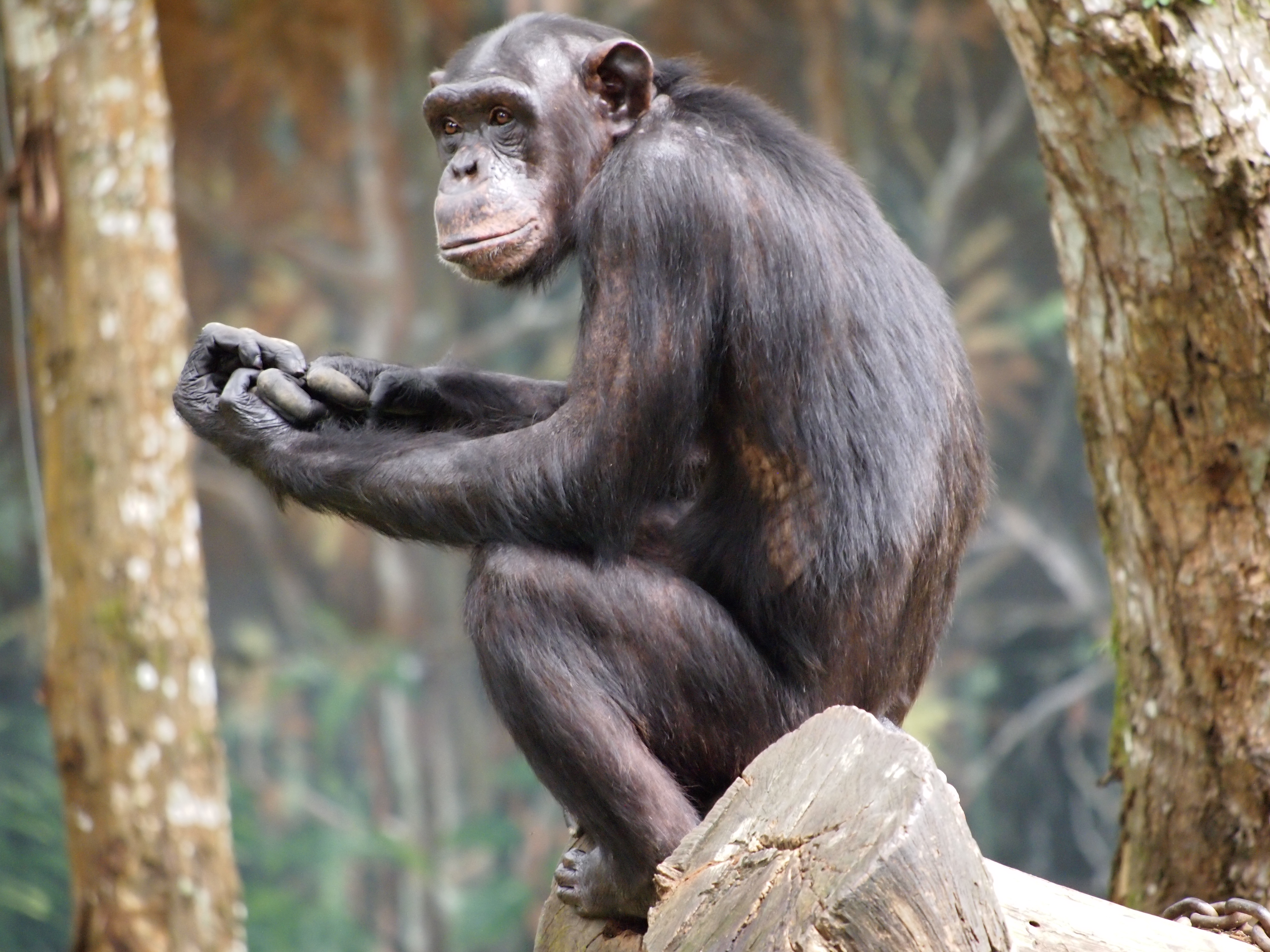
Pan troglodytes

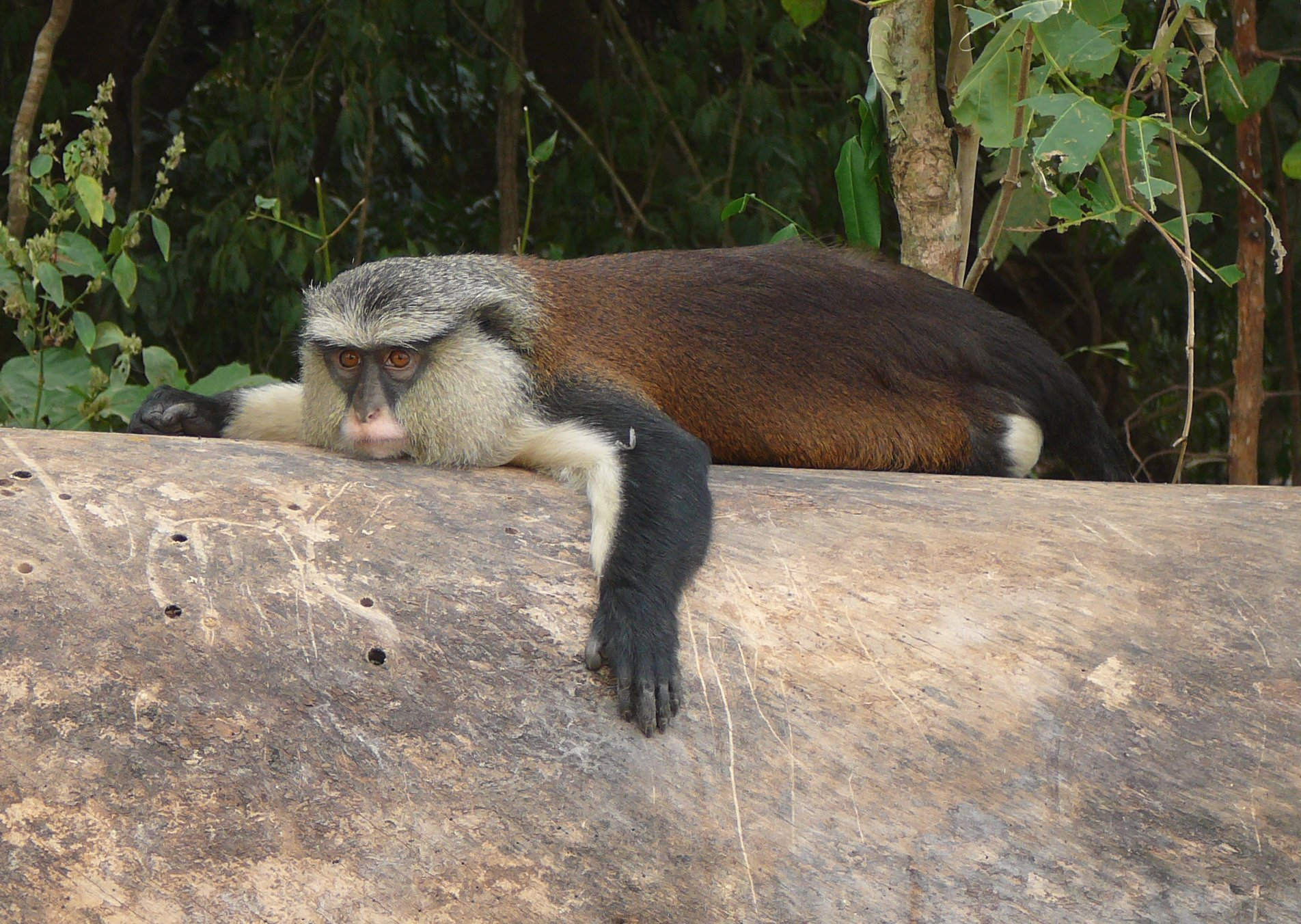
Cercopithecus mona

=== Mammals ===
- Guinea baboon
- Red river hog

=== Birds ===
- Blue-headed wood-dove
- Iris glossy-starling

=== Reptiles ===
- Bitis rhinoceros

== Gallery ==
Wildlife of Ghana
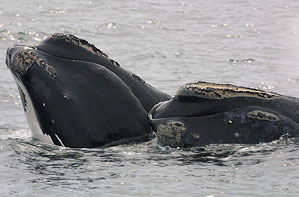
Whales in Ghana

Gazelles in Ghana

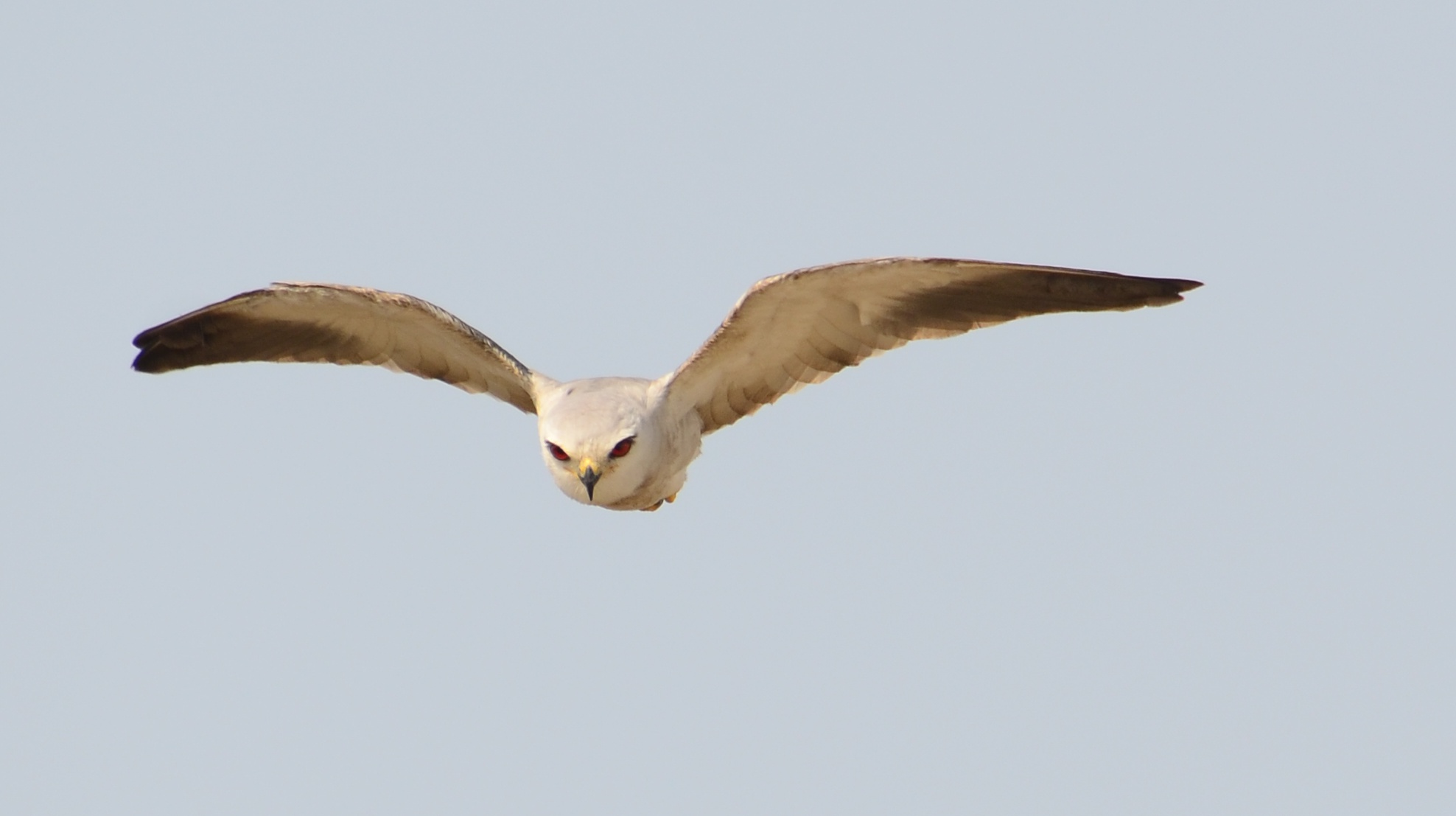
Black-winged kite in Ghana

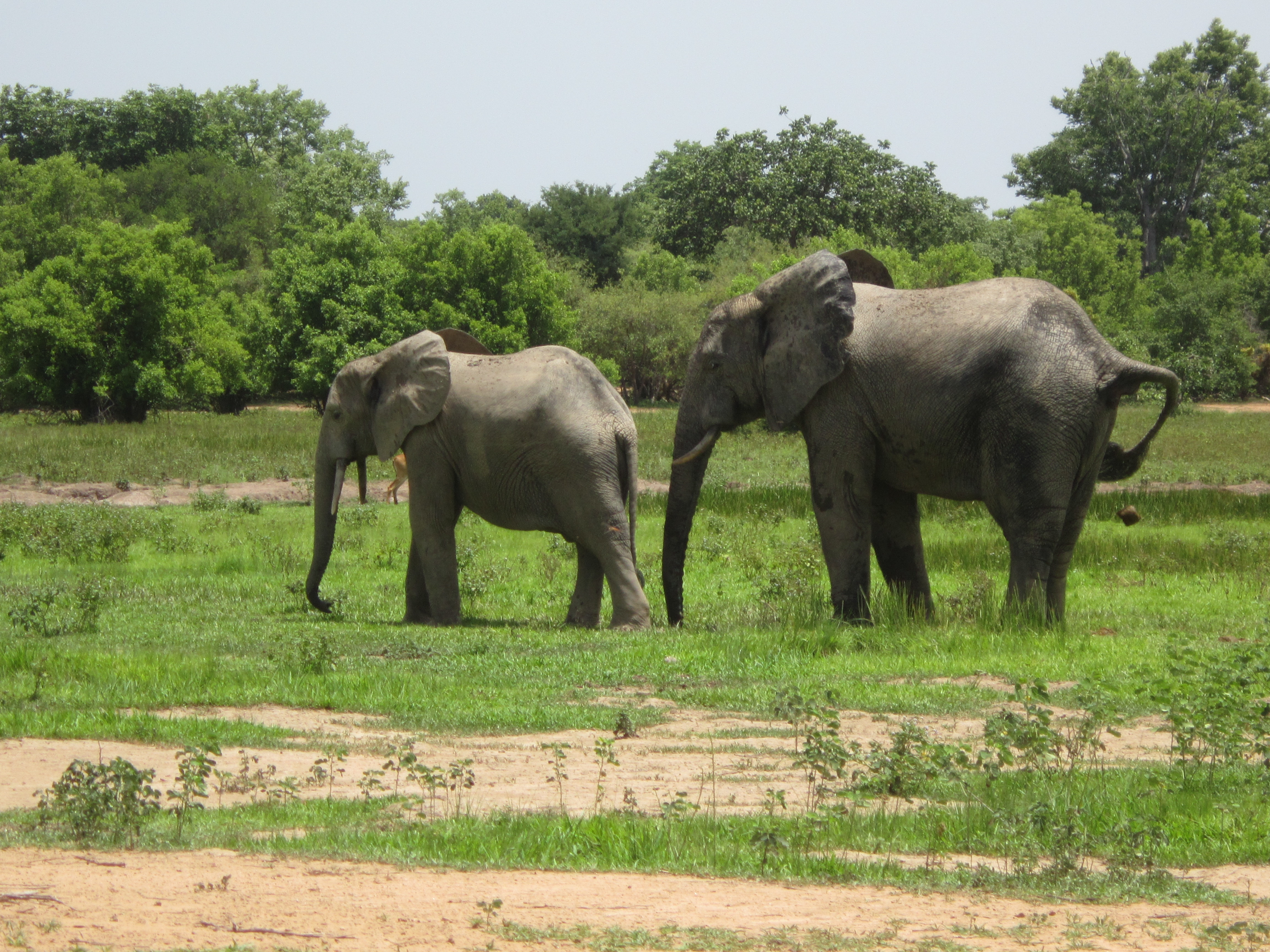
African elephants at Mole National Park
