= Ghana Wildlife Society =

Conservationist NGO

Ghana Wildlife Society

The Ghana Wildlife Society is a conservationist NGO seeking to support Ghana's diverse wildlife to help provide both a "better environment" and an "improved quality of life for all people". Wildlife in Ghana is diverse and abundant, with a wide variety of mammals, reptiles, insects and marine species found in a wide range of habitats across the country. The society is BirdLife International's partner in Ghana.

The society was formed in the early 1970s but then suffered from a hiatus in its activities. It was restarted in 1991 through a "Save the Seashore Birds Project - Ghana (SSPC-G)". This project ended in June 1994 and the Society took over the work of that project.

The Society is involved with many conservation projects including the Important Bird Areas Project-Ghana, the Amanzuri Community Integrated Project, the Mount Afadjato Community Forest Conservation Project, the Wetlands and Waterbird Conservation Project, the Conservation Awareness Programme in schools and communities, and the Marine Turtle Conservation Programme. The projects are supported by a range of overseas donors including the Royal Society for the Protection of Birds (RSPB), the United Nations Development Programme, and the Royal Netherlands Embassy in Ghana. The RSPB, for example, is working with the Ghana Wildlife Society to restore wildlife habitat areas around the Mole National Park.
