= Kparia Waterfalls =

Waterfall in Savannah Region, Ghana

Kparia Waterfalls is located within the Mole National Park. It is a waterfall along the Kparia river. It derives its source from the Konkori Escarpment. It is located in the Savannah region of Ghana.

== Features ==
It is claimed to be approximately 20 metres in height. The fall is of two segments which are the pool at the base and the waterfall. It is known for its pool formation which allows for easy swimming. It has an evergreen forest around the pool making it a place for camping and provision of habitat for fauna.
