= Konkori Escarpment =

Landform in Ghana

Konkori Escarpment is an escarpment which runs from the north to south and leans along the western side of the Mole National Park in Ghana.

== Features ==
The escarpment has a sandstone ridge claimed to be approximately 250metres high. It provides a view of the Mole National Park as it runs through the park. It overlooks waterholes where animals in the park drink and take a shower during hot days. The Konkori escarpment has a cave that was formally used as a refuge from slave raiders by the local people. It is a source of two waterfalls called the Polzen Waterfalls and the Kparia Waterfalls.
