= Polzen Waterfalls =

Waterfall in Savannah Region, Ghana

Polzen Waterfalls is located within the Mole National Park in Ghana. It is a waterfall which flows throughout the year. It derives its source from the Konkori Escarpment. It is located in the Savannah region of Ghana.

== Features ==
It is surrounded by thick forest which forms as a canopy. It is a source of water for wildlife and provides a breeze at its base. The water moves gently into rocks. It joins the Polzen river at a distance of 500metres away. The Polzen waterfall is a water catchment area in the park which has been claimed to be developed in a waterfall downstream.
