= Mole National Park =

Wildlife refuge in Ghana

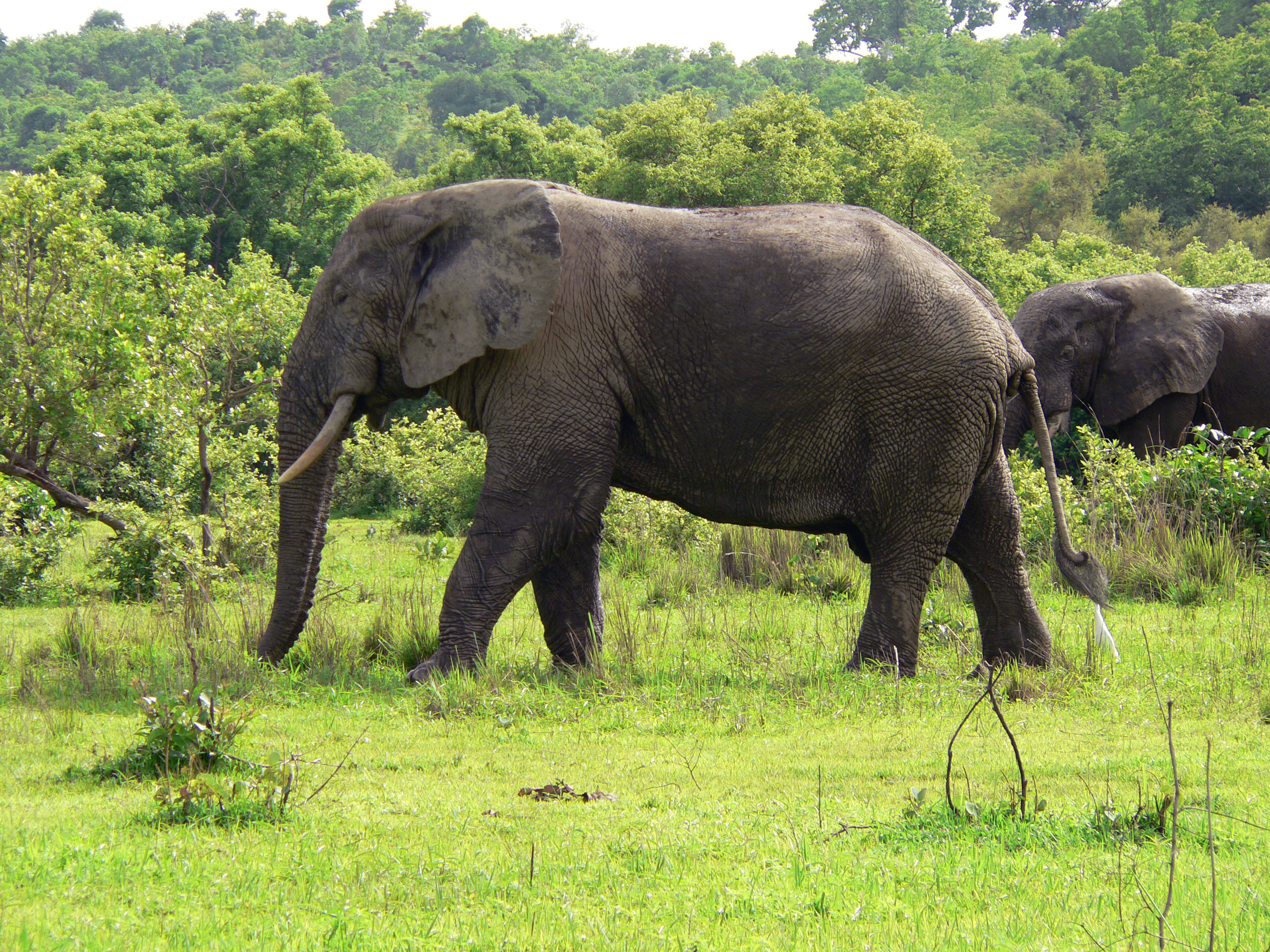
- An African bush elephant at the park

- Location within Ghana
- Location: Ghana
- Nearest city: Larabanga
- Coordinates: 9°42′N 1°50′W
- Area: 4,840 km^{2} (1,870 sq mi)
- Established: 1958

Mole National Park, one of Ghana's seven national parks, is the country's largest wildlife refuge. The park is located in the Savannah region of Ghana on savanna and riparian ecosystems at an elevation of 50 m, with a sharp escarpment forming the southern boundary of the park. The Park is 24 km from Damongo, the district capital, 146 km south east of Tamale, the Regional capital. The park is 700 km from Accra and 430 km from Kumasi. The park's entrance is reached through the nearby town of Larabanga. It covers an area of about 4,577 square kilometers of fairly undisturbed Guinea savannah in the northern part of Ghana. The Levi and Mole Rivers are ephemeral rivers flowing through the park, leaving behind only drinking holes during the long dry season. This area of Ghana receives over 10 mm per year of rainfall. A long-term study has been done on Mole National Park to understand the impact of human hunters on the animals in the preserve.

The park is also Ghana's most developed tourism site in terms of tourist amenities. The reserve has West Africa's first luxury safari lodge.

== History ==
The park's lands were set aside as a wildlife refuge in 1958. In 1971, the small human population of the area was relocated and the lands were designated to a national park. The park has not seen major development as a tourist location since its original designation. The Mole National park as a protective area is underfunded and national and international concerns exist about poaching and sustainability in the park, but its protection of important resident antelope species has improved since its initial founding as a preserve.

Since the resettlement of humans from the area, the park has become an important study area for scientists. This has allowed for some long-term studies, in particular, of relatively undisturbed sites compared to similar areas of densely populated equatorial West Africa. One study on the resident population of 800 elephants, for example, indicates that elephant damage to large trees varies with species. In Mole, elephants have a greater tendency to seriously injure economically important species such as Burkea africana, an important tropical hardwood, and Vitellaria paradoxa, the source of shea butter, over the less important Terminalia spp.

Recently, honey made from flowers in the Molé National Forest has become the region's first fair-trade commodity. Nearby, villagers harvest the honey using traditional, non-invasive methods, and have partnered with a Utah-based company to sell the honey as a health and wellness supplement in the US. The program was co-founded by Ashanti Chief Nana Kwasi Agyemang, who hopes to re-ignite local interest in the honey and eventually export it to other countries in Africa.

== Flora ==
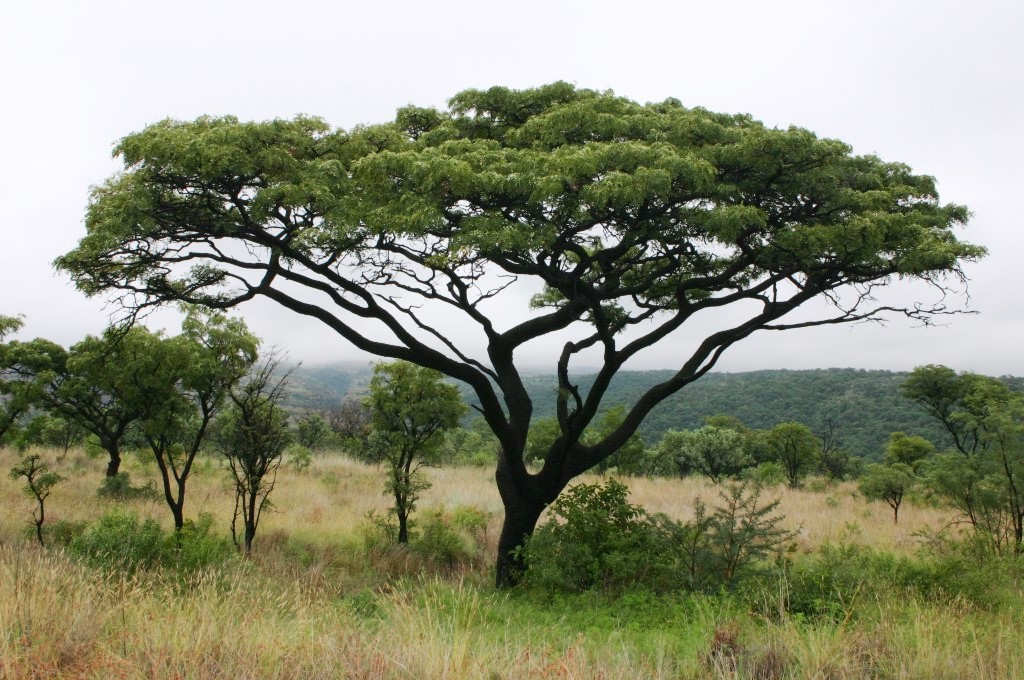
Burkea africana, a species common in tropical Africa including Mole National Park

Tree species of the park include Burkea africana, Isoberlinia doka, and Terminalia macroptera. The savanna grasses are somewhat low in diversity but known species include a spikesedge, Kyllinga echinata; an Aneilema, Aneilema setiferum var. pallidiciliatum; and two endemic members of the Asclepiadaceae subfamily, the vine Gongronema obscurum, and the edible geophyte, Raphionacme vignei.

Trees:

- Adansonia digitata
- Afzelia africana
- Anogeissus leiocarpus
- Afraegle paniculata
- Burkea africana
- Butyrospermum paradoxum
- Cassia sieberana
- Celastrus senegalensis
- Combretum ghasalense
- Detarium microcarpum
- Grewia lasiodiscus
- Grewia mollis
- Lannea acida
- Maytenus senegalensis
- Piliostigma thonningii
- Pterocarpus erinaceus
- Sterculia setigera
- Tamarindus indica
- Terminalia spp., including T. avicennioides
- Ximenia americana

Shrubs:

- Diospyros mespiliformis
- Feretia apodanthera
- Flueggea virosa
- Tinnsea spp.
- Urginea spp.

Herbaceous plants:

- Abutilon ramosum
- Aneilema umbrosum
- Blepharis maderaspatensis
- Cajanus scarabaeoides
- Cyperus alternifolius
- Desmodium velutinum
- Ruellia
- Sida urens
- Triumfetta pentandra
- Wissadula amplissima

Grasslands:

- Andropogon spp., including Andropogon gayanus var. squamulatus (a tall grass)
- Brachiaria spp.
- Loudetiopsis kerstingii
- Sporobolus pyramidalis (only in protected areas)
- Setaria barbata (only in protected areas)

== Fauna ==
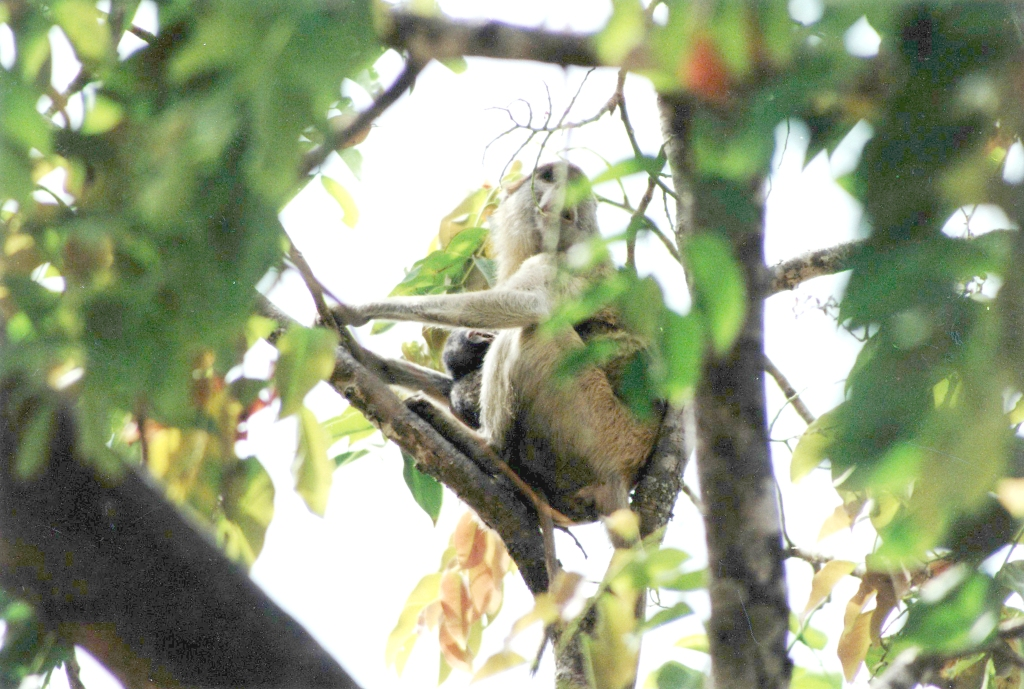
Old World monkeys are common in the park

The park is home to over 93 mammal species, and the large mammals including an elephant population, hippos, buffalo, and warthogs. The park is considered a primary African preserve for antelope species including kob, defassa waterbuck, roan, hartebeest, oribi, the bushbuck, and two duikers, the red duiker and yellow-backed duiker. Olive baboons, black-and-white colobus monkeys, the green vervet, and patas monkeys are the known species of monkeys resident in the park. Of the 33 known species of reptiles slender-snouted and dwarf crocodile are found in the park. Sightings of hyenas, lions and leopards are unusual, but these carnivores were once more common in the park. Among the 344 listed bird species are the martial eagle, the white-headed and palm-nut vultures, saddle-billed storks, herons, egrets, the Abyssinian roller, the violet turaco, various shrikes and the red-throated bee-eater. The park has been designated an Important Bird Area (IBA) by BirdLife International because it supports significant populations of many bird species.

Mole National Park, like other Ghanaian game preserves, is poorly funded for prevention of poaching. Nevertheless, the fauna of the park is guarded by professional rangers, and the poachers are at real risk to be put under arrest. Poachers tend to live within 50 km of the boundaries of the park. This distance of 50 km is the reported greatest distance hunters were willing to travel with poached game. The remnant human population of the park was removed in 1961, leaving all game hunters outside the reserve, meaning that mammal populations on the edges of the park are impacted more by hunting than interior populations.

== Tourism ==
After improvements to the roads leading to the park, the number of visitors to the park increased from 14,600 in 2014 to 17,800 in 2015. Depending on the year, about 20-40% of visitors are foreigners. Farouk Umaru Dubiure, the Park Manager, says, "though we received many visitors, the funds generated were very low because 70 percent of the visitors were Ghanaian students who pay little to visit the park. These students also visit the Park on the same day and return, compared to the foreigners who spend more days to view the Park well."

The new road was also blamed for facilitating illegal rosewood logging bound for China.

Elephants in the vicinity of the Mole Lodge are considered to be used to humans, so visitors can have a very close encounter on foot, which is very rare in Africa. Antelope, bushbuck, monkey, warthog, baboon, and other small games are also present, depending on the season. One writer suggests that the best time to visit is between mid-December and mid-April, as the lack of water brings the animals closer to known water sources.

Other tourist attractions around the Mole area include the Bui National Park, Paga Crocodile Pond, Larabanga Mosque, Cathedral Basilica of Our Lady of the Seven Sorrows.

== See also ==
- Wildlife of Ghana
- West Africa
