= Sporobolus natalensis =

Scientific classification
- Kingdom: Plantae
- Clade: Tracheophytes
- Clade: Angiosperms
- Clade: Monocots
- Clade: Commelinids
- Order: Poales
- Family: Poaceae
- Subfamily: Chloridoideae
- Genus: Sporobolus
- Species: S. natalensis

Binomial name
- Sporobolus natalensis (Steud.) T.Durand & Schinz

Species of grass

Sporobolus natalensis is a species of grass native to central and southern Africa. It does not have a distinct established English name, but it is one of the two species of giant rat's tail grasses. In Australia, outside of its native range, it has become a significant environmental weed.
