= Giant rat's tail grass =

Giant rat's tail grass or giant rats tail grass refers to two species of Sporobolus grasses.

- Sporobolus pyramidalis P.Beauv.
- Sporobolus natalensis (Steud.) T.Durand & Schinz
