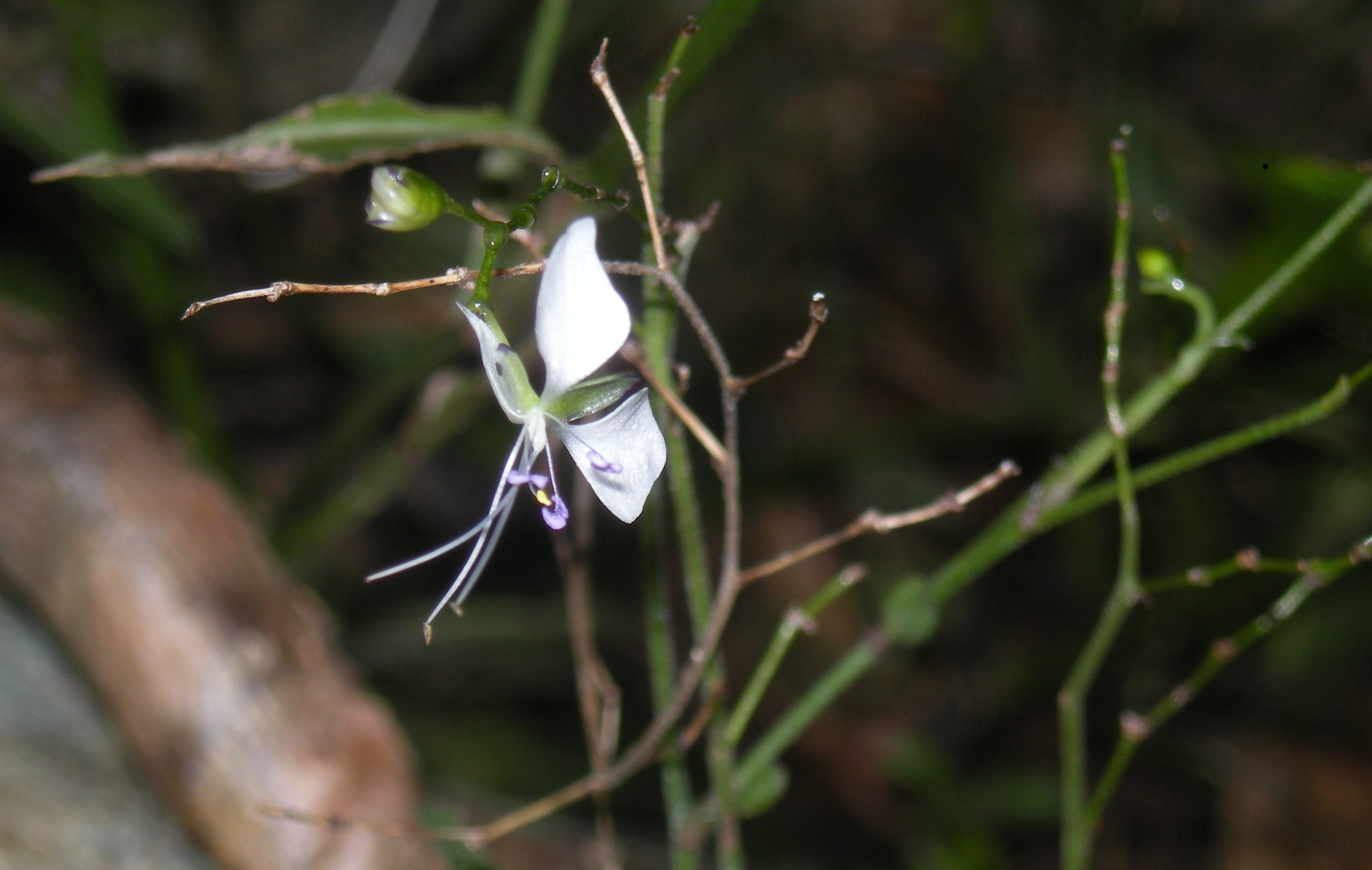

Scientific classification
- Kingdom: Plantae
- Clade: Embryophytes
- Clade: Tracheophytes
- Clade: Spermatophytes
- Clade: Angiosperms
- Clade: Monocots
- Clade: Commelinids
- Order: Commelinales
- Family: Commelinaceae
- Genus: Aneilema
- Species: A. acuminatum

Binomial name
- Aneilema acuminatum R.Br.

= Aneilema acuminatum =

Species of flowering plant

Aneilema acuminatum is a species of herbaceous plant in the family Commelinaceae. It is native to New Guinea, Maluku, Solomon Islands, and in Australia (Queensland and New South Wales). Its natural habitat consists of rainforest, riparian forests and moist areas within drier forests and woodlands.

== Gallery ==
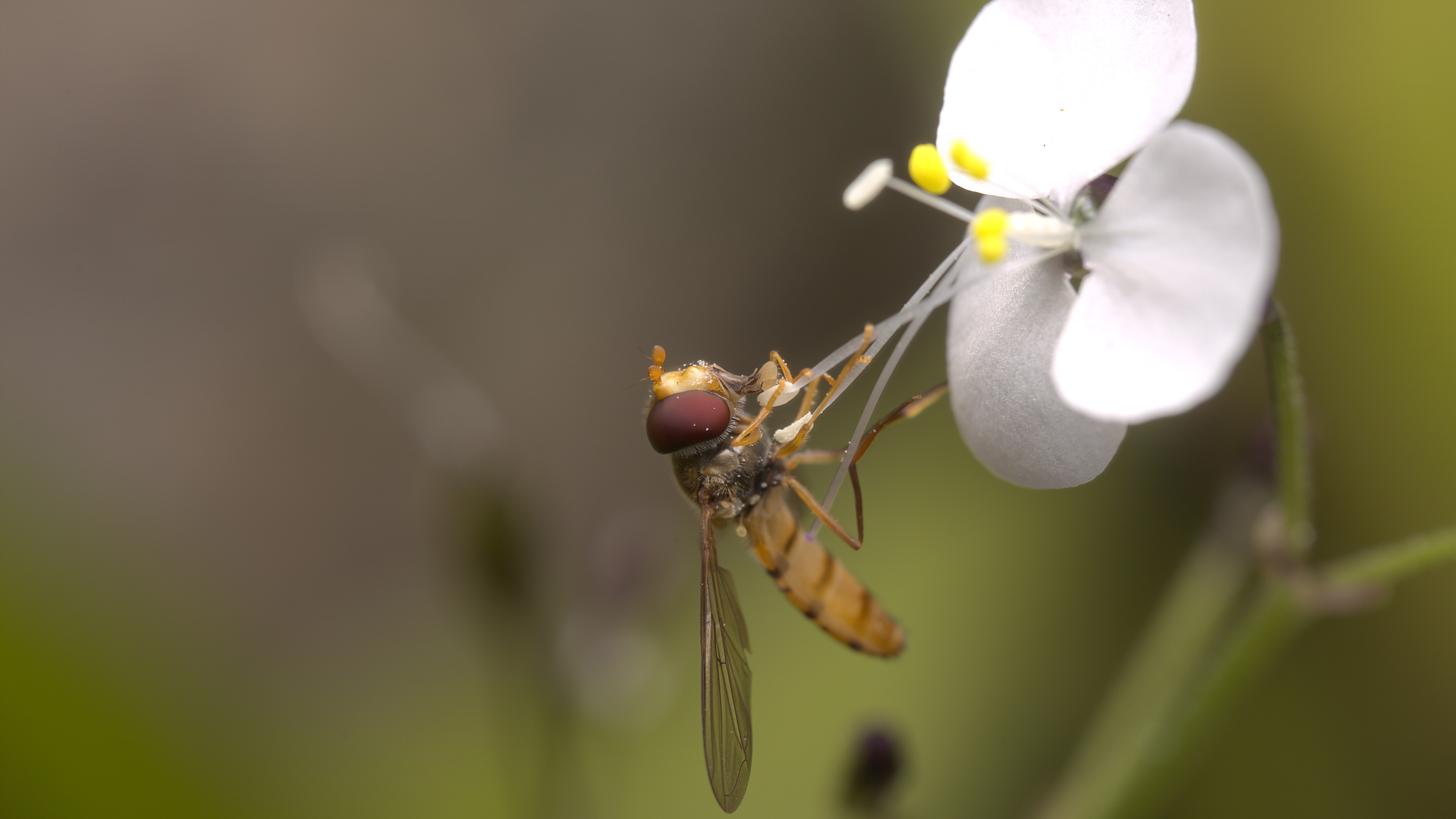
Hoverfly on A. acuminatum

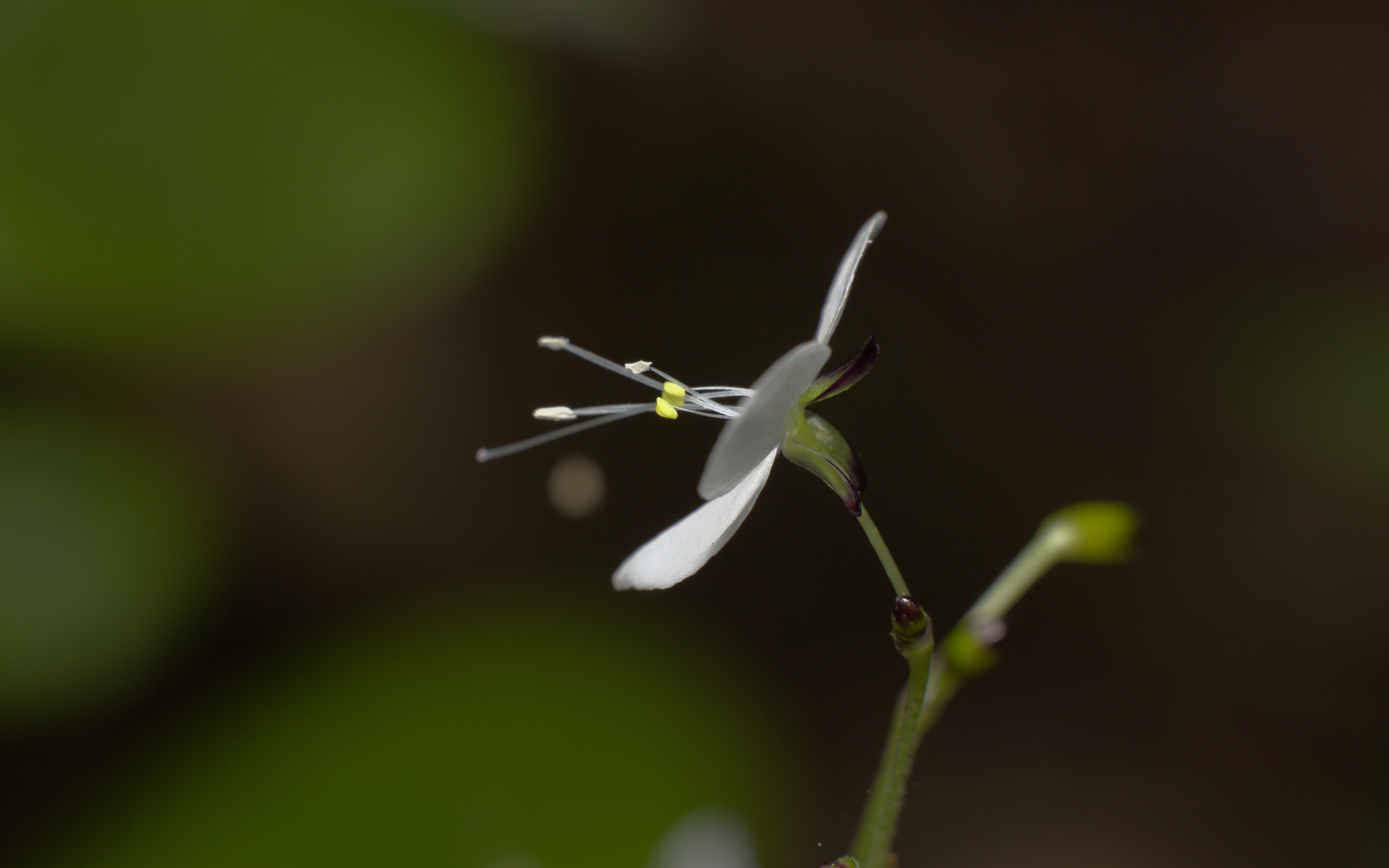
A. acuminatum in a subtropical rainforest

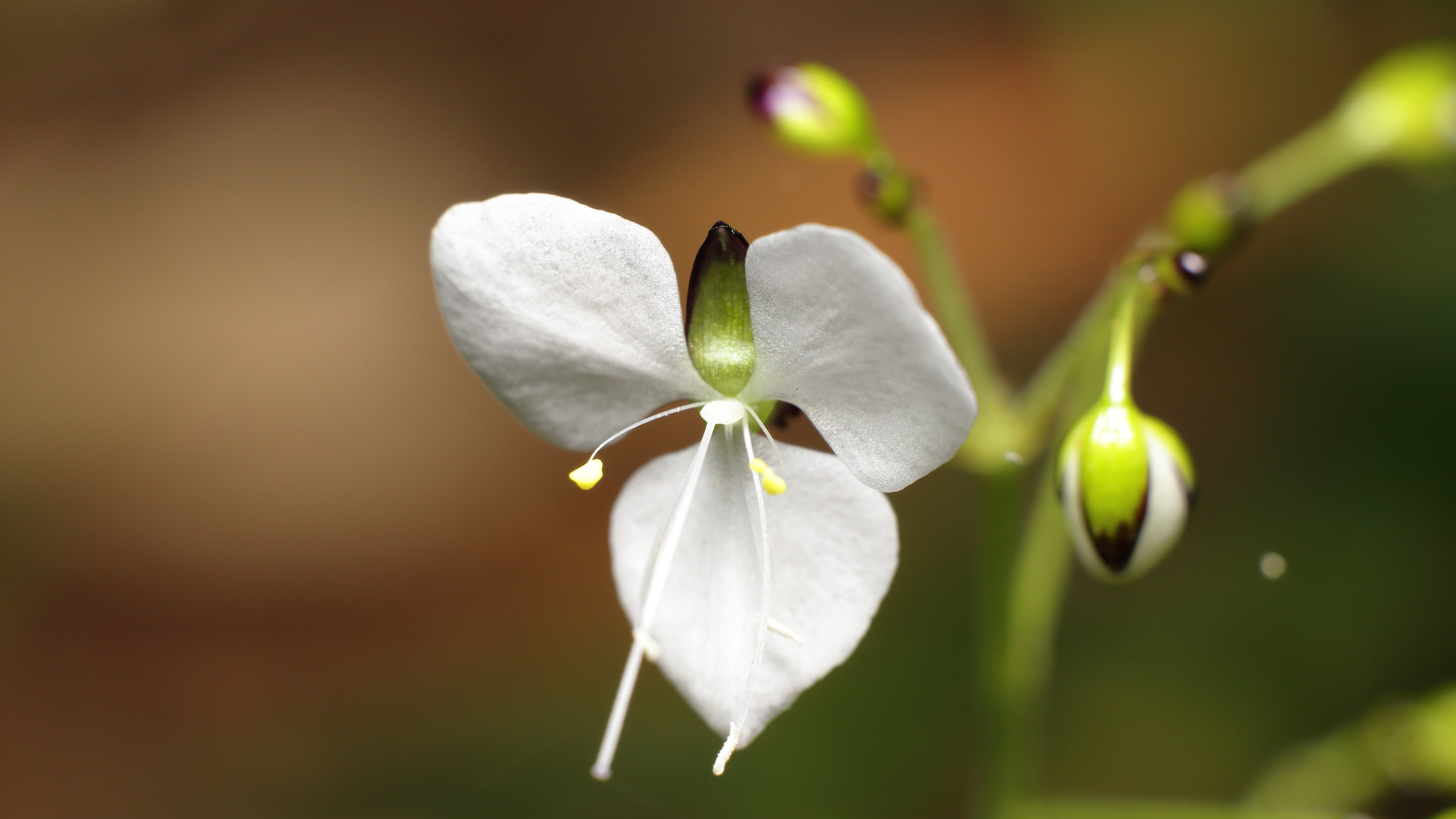
A. acuminatum petals
