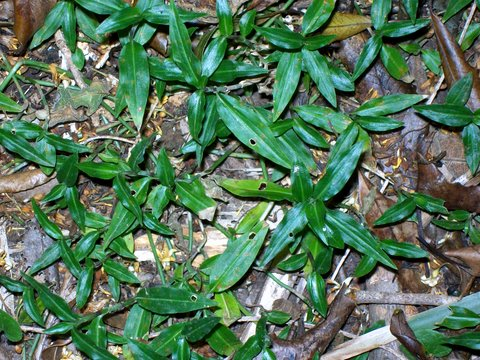
- Aneilema biflorum at Eastwood, Australia

Scientific classification
- Kingdom: Plantae
- Clade: Tracheophytes
- Clade: Angiosperms
- Clade: Monocots
- Clade: Commelinids
- Order: Commelinales
- Family: Commelinaceae
- Genus: Aneilema
- Species: A. biflorum

Binomial name
- Aneilema biflorum R.Br.

Synonyms
- Commelina biflora (R.Br.) Poir. ex Roem. & Schult.

= Aneilema biflorum =

Species of flowering plant

Aneilema biflorum is a perennial herb in the family Commelinaceae. It grows in moist and shaded places, often near streams in eastern Australia. A ground covering plant, growing to 20 cm tall. White flowers occur between December and March. The wrinkled fruit is flattened, 4 mm long, with pale grey seeds.
