= Wissadula excelsior =

Conservation status
- Endangered (IUCN 3.1)

Scientific classification
- Kingdom: Plantae
- Clade: Tracheophytes
- Clade: Angiosperms
- Clade: Eudicots
- Clade: Rosids
- Order: Malvales
- Family: Malvaceae
- Genus: Wissadula
- Species: W. excelsior

Binomial name
- Wissadula excelsior (Cav.) C.Presl

Synonyms
- Synonymy: Abutilon excelsior (Cav.) G.Don; Abutilon ferrugineum Kunth; Abutilon patens A.St.-Hil.; Abutilon rufescens Turcz.; Sida calophylla Poepp. ex R.E.Fr.; Sida excelsior Cav. (1785) (basionym); Sida ferruginea (Kunth) DC.; Sida patens (A.St.-Hil.) D.Dietr.; Wissadula diffusa R.E.Fr.; Wissadula ferruginea (Kunth) Garcke & K.Schum.; Wissadula patens (A.St.-Hil.) Garcke; Wissadula periplocifolia var. guatemalensis (Baker f.) Hochr.; Wissadula periplocifolia var. wrightiana Griseb.; Wissadula rostrata var. wrightiana (Griseb.) M.Gómez; Wissadula zeylanica var. guatemalense Baker f.; Wissadula zeylanica var. wrightiana (Griseb.) Baker f.

Species of flowering plant

Wissadula excelsior is a species of plant in the family Malvaceae. It is a subshrub or shrub native to the tropical Americas, ranging from northeastern Mexico through Central and South America to northeastern Argentina, and to Cuba, where it grows in seasonally dry tropical forests.

The species was first described as Sida excelsior by Antonio José Cavanilles in 1785. It was placed in genus Wissadula by Carl Borivoj Presl in 1835. Several species and variety names have been synonymized with it.

The IUCN Red List lists the synonym Wissadula diffusa, with a distribution limited to Ecuador, as endangered. The Angiosperm Extinction Risk Predictions v1 (2024) assesses Wissadula excelsior as not threatened, with high confidence.
