= Aneilema silvaticum =

Conservation status
- Vulnerable (IUCN 3.1)

Scientific classification
- Kingdom: Plantae
- Clade: Tracheophytes
- Clade: Angiosperms
- Clade: Monocots
- Clade: Commelinids
- Order: Commelinales
- Family: Commelinaceae
- Genus: Aneilema
- Species: A. silvaticum

Binomial name
- Aneilema silvaticum Brenan

Species of flowering plant

Aneilema silvaticum is a species of plant in the family Commelinaceae. It is found in Cameroon, the Democratic Republic of the Congo, the Gulf of Guinea Islands, Nigeria, and Togo. Its natural habitat is subtropical or tropical moist lowland forests. It is threatened by habitat loss.
