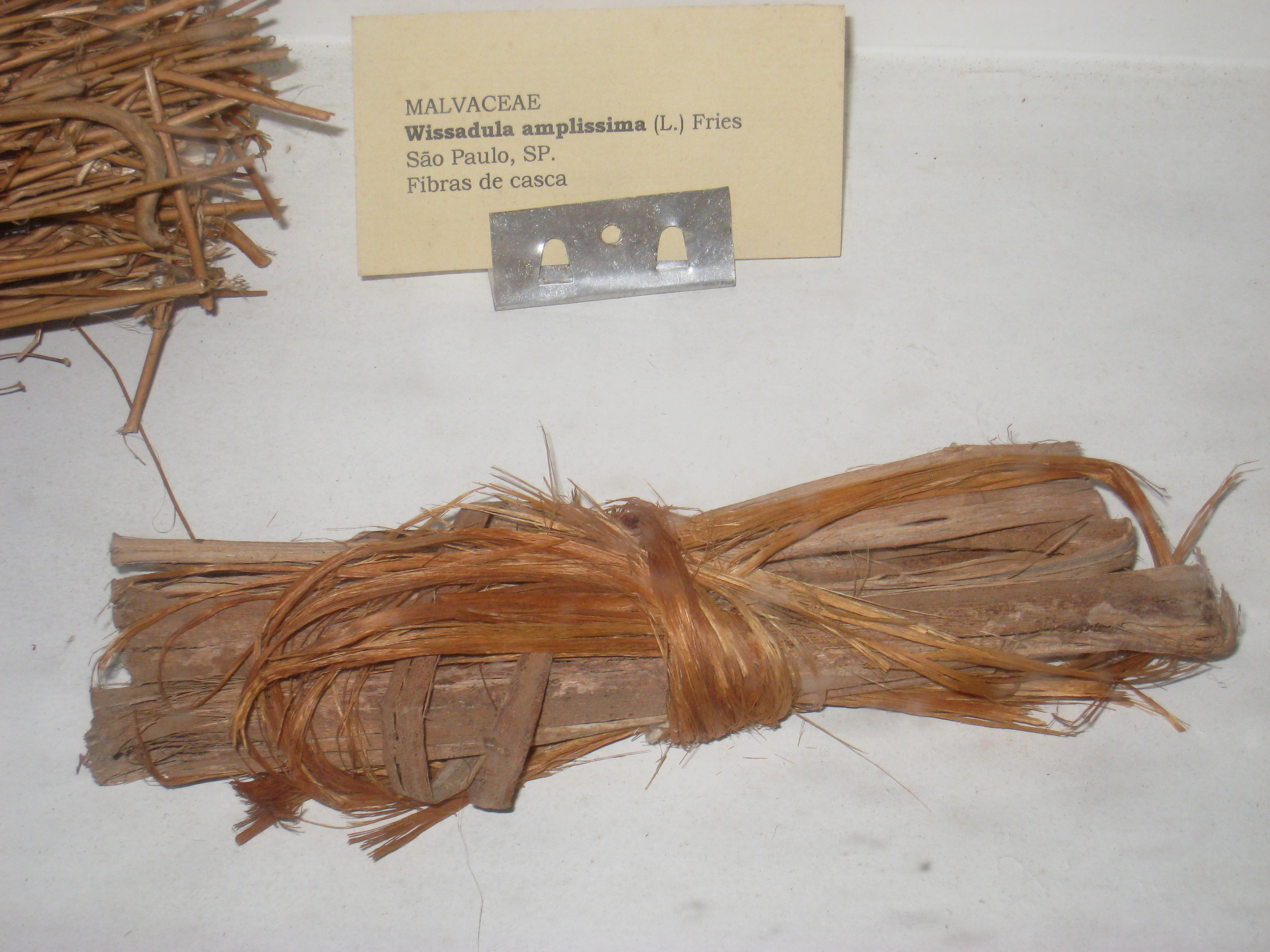

Scientific classification
- Kingdom: Plantae
- Clade: Tracheophytes
- Clade: Angiosperms
- Clade: Eudicots
- Clade: Rosids
- Order: Malvales
- Family: Malvaceae
- Subfamily: Malvoideae
- Tribe: Malveae
- Genus: Wissadula; Medik.

Type species
- Wissadula zeylanica Medik.

Species
- See text

= Wissadula =

Genus of plants

Wissadula is a genus of flowering plants in the mallow family, Malvaceae. It contains 38 species of herbs and subshrubs that are mostly native to the Neotropics, with several in tropical Asia and Africa. The name is derived from the Sinhala language.

== Species ==
38 species are accepted.

- Wissadula amplissima (L.) R.E.Fr. – Big yellow velvetleaf
- Wissadula andina Britton
- Wissadula boliviana R.E.Fr.
- Wissadula cardenasii Krapov.
- Wissadula caribaea (DC.) Bovini
- Wissadula contracta (Link) R.E.Fr. – Contracted velvetleaf
- Wissadula costaricensis Standl.
- Wissadula cruziana R.E.Fr.
- Wissadula cuspidata (R.E.Fr.) Bovini
- Wissadula decora S.Moore
- Wissadula delicata Bovini
- Wissadula densiflora R.E.Fr.
- Wissadula divergens (Benth.) Benth. & Hook.f. ex Garcke
- Wissadula ecuadoriensis Fryxell
- Wissadula excelsior (Cav.) C.Presl (synonym W. diffusa R.E.Fr.)
- Wissadula fadyenii R.E.Fr.
- Wissadula glechomifolia (A.St.-Hil.) R.E.Fr.
- Wissadula grandifolia Baker f.
- Wissadula gymnanthemum (Griseb.) K.Schum.
- Wissadula hernandioides (L'Hér.) Garcke
- Wissadula indivisa R.E.Fr.
- Wissadula krapovickasiana Bovini
- Wissadula macrantha R.E.Fr.
- Wissadula macrocarpa Fryxell
- Wissadula microcarpa R.E.Fr.
- Wissadula paraguariensis Chodat
- Wissadula parviflora (A.St.-Hil.) R.E.Fr.
- Wissadula parvifolia Fryxell
- Wissadula pavonii Hochr.
- Wissadula peredoi Krapov.
- Wissadula periplocifolia (L.) Thwaites – White velvetleaf
- Wissadula rostrata (Schumach. & Thonn.) Hook.
- Wissadula setifera Krapov.
- Wissadula sordida Hochr.
- Wissadula stellata (Cav.) K.Schum.
- Wissadula stipulata Bovini
- Wissadula tucumanensis R.E.Fr.
- Wissadula wissadifolia (Griseb.) Krapov.

=== Formerly placed here ===
- Briquetia spicata (Kunth) Fryxell (as W. spicata (Kunth) C.Presl)
