= Wissadula divergens =

Conservation status
- Endangered (IUCN 3.1)

Scientific classification
- Kingdom: Plantae
- Clade: Tracheophytes
- Clade: Angiosperms
- Clade: Eudicots
- Clade: Rosids
- Order: Malvales
- Family: Malvaceae
- Genus: Wissadula
- Species: W. divergens

Binomial name
- Wissadula divergens (Benth.) Benth. & Hook.

Species of flowering plant

Wissadula divergens is a species of plant in the family Malvaceae. It is endemic to Ecuador. Its natural habitats are subtropical or tropical dry forests and subtropical or tropical dry shrubland.
