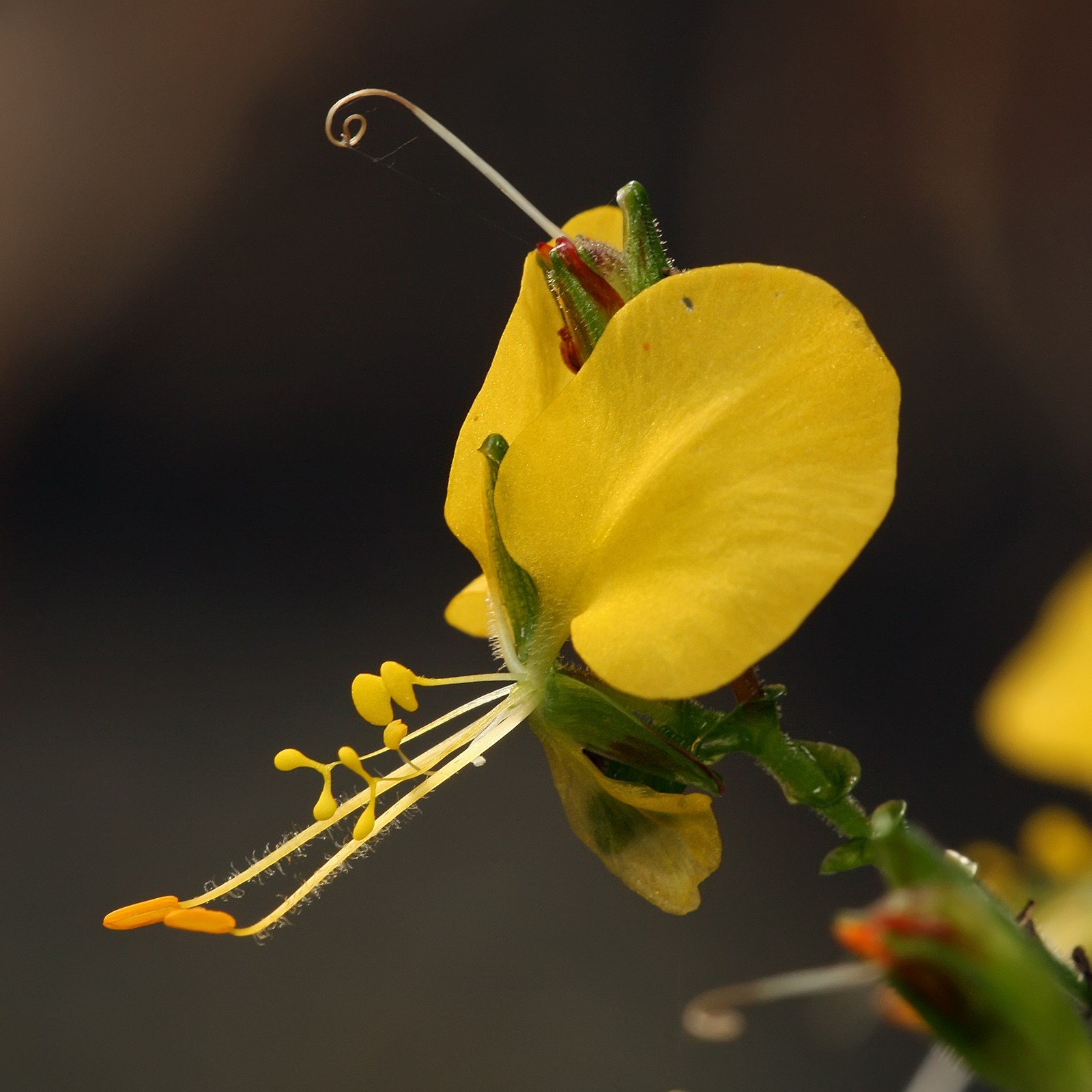
- Aneilema aequinoctiale flower

Scientific classification
- Kingdom: Plantae
- Clade: Tracheophytes
- Clade: Angiosperms
- Clade: Monocots
- Clade: Commelinids
- Order: Commelinales
- Family: Commelinaceae
- Subfamily: Commelinoideae
- Tribe: Commelineae
- Genus: Aneilema; R.Br.

Type species
- A. biflorum R.Br.

Synonyms
- Lamprodithyros Hassk.; Bauschia Seub. ex Warm.; Amelina C.B.Clarke; Phaeneilema G.Brückn.; Ballya Brenan

= Aneilema =

Genus of flowering plants

Aneilema is a genus of monocotyledonous plants of approximately 60 species. The vast majority of the species are native to sub-Saharan Africa, but a few are found in Oceania and one, Aneilema brasiliense, is from South America. It is the third largest genus in the family Commelinaceae after Commelina and Tradescantia, and it is one of only six genera in the family to occur in both the Eastern Hemisphere and the Western Hemisphere.

Aneilema consists of herbs that may be either perennial or annual. They are characterised by their zygomorphic flowers which, unlike the closely related genus Commelina, usually lack a modified leaf enclosing the flower stalk at maturity. The uppermost leaf on the flowering stalk is often highly modified, however, and in a few species, such as Aneilema clarkei, the upper leaf does completely surround the inflorescence. The flowering stalks of Aneilema tend to be much larger than those of Commelina, with some species having inflorescences of more than 25 cm in length, although some are as short as 2 cm.

Species

- Aneilema acuminatum R.Br. - New Guinea, Maluku, Solomon Islands, Queensland, New South Wales
- Aneilema aequinoctiale P.Beauv. - tropical + southern Africa
- Aneilema alatum Koord. - Java
- Aneilema angolense C.B.Clarke - Angola
- Aneilema aparine H.Perrier - Madagascar
- Aneilema arenicola Faden - KwaZulu-Natal, Mozambique
- Aneilema benadirense Chiov. - Somalia
- Aneilema beniniense (P.Beauv.) Kunth - tropical Africa
- Aneilema biflorum R.Br. - Queensland, New South Wales
- Aneilema brasiliense C.B.Clarke - Brazil, Venezuela
- Aneilema brenanianum Faden - Kenya, Tanzania
- Aneilema brunneospermum Faden - Mozambique, Eswatini, South Africa
- Aneilema calceolus Brenan - Kenya, Tanzania
- Aneilema chrysopogon Brenan - Zambia, Tanzania
- Aneilema clarkei Rendle - Kenya, Tanzania
- Aneilema dispermum Brenan - Malawi, Tanzania
- Aneilema dregeanum Kunth - Mozambique, Eswatini, South Africa; naturalized in Vietnam
- Aneilema ephemerum Faden - Kenya
- Aneilema forsskalii Kunth - Ethiopia, Sudan, Djibouti, Yemen, Oman, Saudi Arabia
- Aneilema gillettii Brenan - Ethiopia, Kenya
- Aneilema grandibracteolatum Faden - Ethiopia
- Aneilema hirtum A.Rich. - eastern Africa from Ethiopia to Zambia
- Aneilema hockii De Wild - eastern + southern Africa
- Aneilema homblei De Wild - DRC
- Aneilema indehiscens Faden - eastern + southern Africa
- Aneilema johnstonii K.Schum. - eastern + southern Africa
- Aneilema lamuense Faden - Kenya, Somalia
- Aneilema lanceolatum Benth. - tropical Africa
- Aneilema leiocaule K.Schum. - eastern + central Africa
- Aneilema longicapsa Faden - Somalia
- Aneilema longirrhizum Faden - Northern Province of South Africa
- Aneilema macrorrhizum T.C.E.Fr. - Tanzania, Zimbabwe, Zambia
- Aneilema minutiflorum Faden - Kenya, Tanzania, Uganda
- Aneilema mortonii Brenan - Ghana, Togo
- Aneilema neocaledonicum Schltr. - Vanuatu, New Caledonia
- Aneilema nicholsonii C.B.Clarke - eastern + southern Africa
- Aneilema nyasense C.B.Clarke - southeastern Africa
- Aneilema obbiadense Chiov. - Somalia
- Aneilema paludosum A.Chev. - western Africa
- Aneilema pedunculosum C.B.Clarke - southeastern Africa
- Aneilema petersii (Hassk.) C.B.Clarke - eastern + southeastern Africa
- Aneilema plagiocapsa K.Schum. - DRC, Zambia, Angola
- Aneilema pomeridianum Stanf. & Brenan - Nigeria, Niger, Togo, Benin, Ghana
- Aneilema pusillum Chiov. - Kenya, Somalia, Ethiopia
- Aneilema recurvatum Faden - Kenya, Uganda, Ethiopia, Tanzania
- Aneilema rendlei C.B.Clarke - Kenya, Ethiopia, Tanzania
- Aneilema richardsiae Brenan - DRC, Zambia, Tanzania
- Aneilema schlechteri K.Schum. - Zimbabwe, Transvaal, Eswatini
- Aneilema sclerocarpum F.Muell. - Queensland
- Aneilema sebitense Faden - Kenya, Ethiopia
- Aneilema setiferum A.Chev. - western Africa
- Aneilema siliculosum R.Br. - Queensland, Northern Territory
- Aneilema silvaticum Brenan - Nigeria, Togo, Cameroon, Bioko, Zaïre
- Aneilema somaliense C.B.Clarke - Kenya, Somalia, Ethiopia
- Aneilema spekei C.B.Clarke - eastern Africa
- Aneilema succulentum Faden - Kenya
- Aneilema tanaense Faden - Kwale District of Kenya
- Aneilema taylorii C.B.Clarke - Kenya, Tanzania
- Aneilema termitarium Faden - Zaïre, Zambia, Tanzania
- Aneilema trispermum Faden - Somalia
- Aneilema umbrosum (Vahl) Kunth - tropical Africa; tropical South America, Trinidad, Costa Rica, Panama
- Aneilema usambarense Faden - Usambara Mountains of Tanzania
- Aneilema welwitschii C.B.Clarke - central + southern Africa
- Aneilema woodii Faden - Yemen
- Aneilema zebrinum Chiov. ex Chiarugi - - Kenya, Ethiopia, Tanzania, KwaZulu-Natal
