= Hyperolius sylvaticus =

Conservation status
- Least Concern (IUCN 3.1)

Scientific classification
- Kingdom: Animalia
- Phylum: Chordata
- Class: Amphibia
- Order: Anura
- Family: Hyperoliidae
- Genus: Hyperolius
- Species: H. sylvaticus

Binomial name
- Hyperolius sylvaticus Schiøtz, 1967

Species of frog

Hyperolius sylvaticus is a species of frog in the family Hyperoliidae. It is found in southern Ivory Coast, Ghana, Togo, Nigeria, and western Cameroon, with a (perhaps apparent) gap in Benin. It is also likely to occur in Liberia. Common name Bobiri reed frog has been coined for this species (this name could also refer to Hyperolius bobirensis).

== Taxonomy ==
Hyperolius sylvaticus was described by Danish herpetologist Arne Schiøtz in 1967, using material from the Bobiri Forest Reserve (Ghana) as the types. He also described two subspecies, Hyperolius sylvaticus ivorensis from Ivory Coast and Hyperolius sylvaticus nigeriensis from Nigeria and Cameroon, in addition to the nominotypical subspecies.

== Description ==
Hyperolius sylvaticus is a small-sized member of its genus, with males measuring 20–29 mm (0.79–1.14 in) and females 26–31 mm (1.0–1.2 in) in snout–vent length. Males have a tiny, round gular flap. The pupil is horizontal. There are two colour phases. All juveniles and many mature males display phase "J", which is typically brownish to green and has a dorsal hourglass pattern. All females, and some males, develop into phase "F" prior to the first breeding season. This phase is often colorful and variable.

Body size and dorsal patterning differs between the subspecies. The nominotypical subspecies has coherent dorsal hourglass pattern (phase J) and undelimited, light dorsolateral stripe (phase F). In Hyperolius s. ivorensis and Hyperolius s. nigeriensis the hourglass pattern is broken mid-dorsally. In addition, Hyperolius s. nigeriensis are larger and have a dark, well delimited area behind eye (phase J) and a broad, dark-delimited dorsolateral stripe (phase F).

Male advertisement call is a series of brief metallic "clicks"; it is not known whether there are differences among the subspecies.

== Habitat and conservation ==
Hyperolius sylvaticus occurs in lowland moist forests as well as in degraded forests and bush land. Breeding takes place in temporary forest ponds. The eggs are placed on leaves above water; the tadpoles fall into the water after hatching.

Hyperolius sylvaticus is an abundant species. It is somewhat adaptable, but does not tolerate complete opening up of its habitat. This makes is vulnerable to habitat change from agricultural expansion and increasing human settlements. It occurs in the Bobiri Forest Reserve and Kakum National Park in Ghana, Taï National Park in Ivory Coast, and Korup National Park in Cameroon, presumably in other protected areas too.
