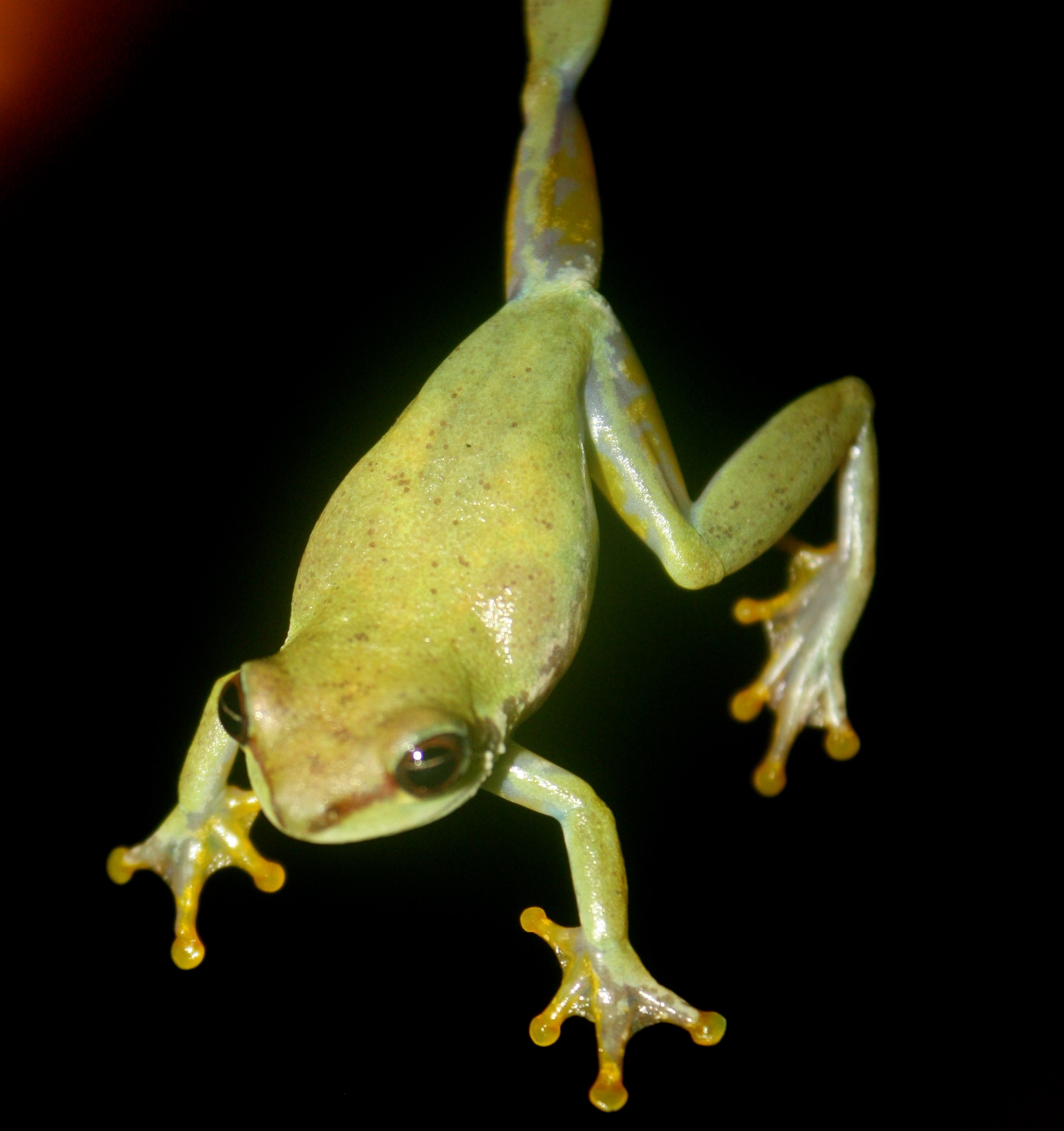

Conservation status
- Least Concern (IUCN 3.1)

Scientific classification
- Kingdom: Animalia
- Phylum: Chordata
- Class: Amphibia
- Order: Anura
- Family: Hyperoliidae
- Genus: Hyperolius
- Species: H. fusciventris

Binomial name
- Hyperolius fusciventris Peters, 1876

= Hyperolius fusciventris =

Species of amphibian

Hyperolius fusciventris is a species of frog in the family Hyperoliidae. It occurs in West and Middle Africa between Sierra Leone in the west and western Cameroon in the east. Common name lime reed frog has been coined for this species.

== Distribution ==
The species is found, from west to east, in Sierra Leone, Guinea, Liberia, Ivory Coast, Ghana, Togo, Benin, Nigeria, and Cameroon. The record from Guinea-Bissau requires confirmation.

== Taxonomy ==
There are three named subspecies, including the nominotypical one, and an unnamed subspecies:

- Hyperolius fusciventris fusciventris — Sierra Leone to westernmost Ivory Coast
- Hyperolius fusciventris lamtoensis — Ivory Coast
- Hyperolius fusciventris burtoni — Ghana to Nigeria
- Hyperolius fusciventris ssp. — Cameroon

The named subspecies may warrant full species status.

== Description ==
Hyperolius guttulatus is a relatively small member of its genus, with males measuring 18–25 mm (0.71–0.98 in) and females 23–28 mm (0.91–1.10 in) in snout–vent length. The pupil is horizontal.

There are two colour phases. All juveniles and many mature males display phase "J", which is light green with conspicuous light dorsolateral stripes; there is often a dark vertebral line. All females, and some males, develop into phase "F" prior to the first breeding season. This phase has a green dorsum.

Male advertisement call consists of two parts, an initial "creak" followed by a small number of "clicks" in rapid succession.

== Habitat and conservation ==
Hyperolius fusciventris clearings in forest, secondary and degraded forests, and heavily degraded former forests (farm bush). In Ivory Coast the subspecies Hyperolius f. lamtoensis lives in primary forest, whereas the other subspecies are more associated with secondary habitats. Breeding takes place in small, temporary pools and marshes. The eggs are deposited on leaves above water.

Hyperolius fusciventris is an abundant species. However, the subspecies Hyperolius f. lamtoensis is threatened by habitat loss caused by agriculture, logging and human settlements. The other subspecies are more adaptable and are believed not to face any significant threats. The species is found in a number of protected areas, e.g., in the Taï National Park (Ivory Coast), and the Ankasa Conservation Area and Kakum National Park in Ghana.
