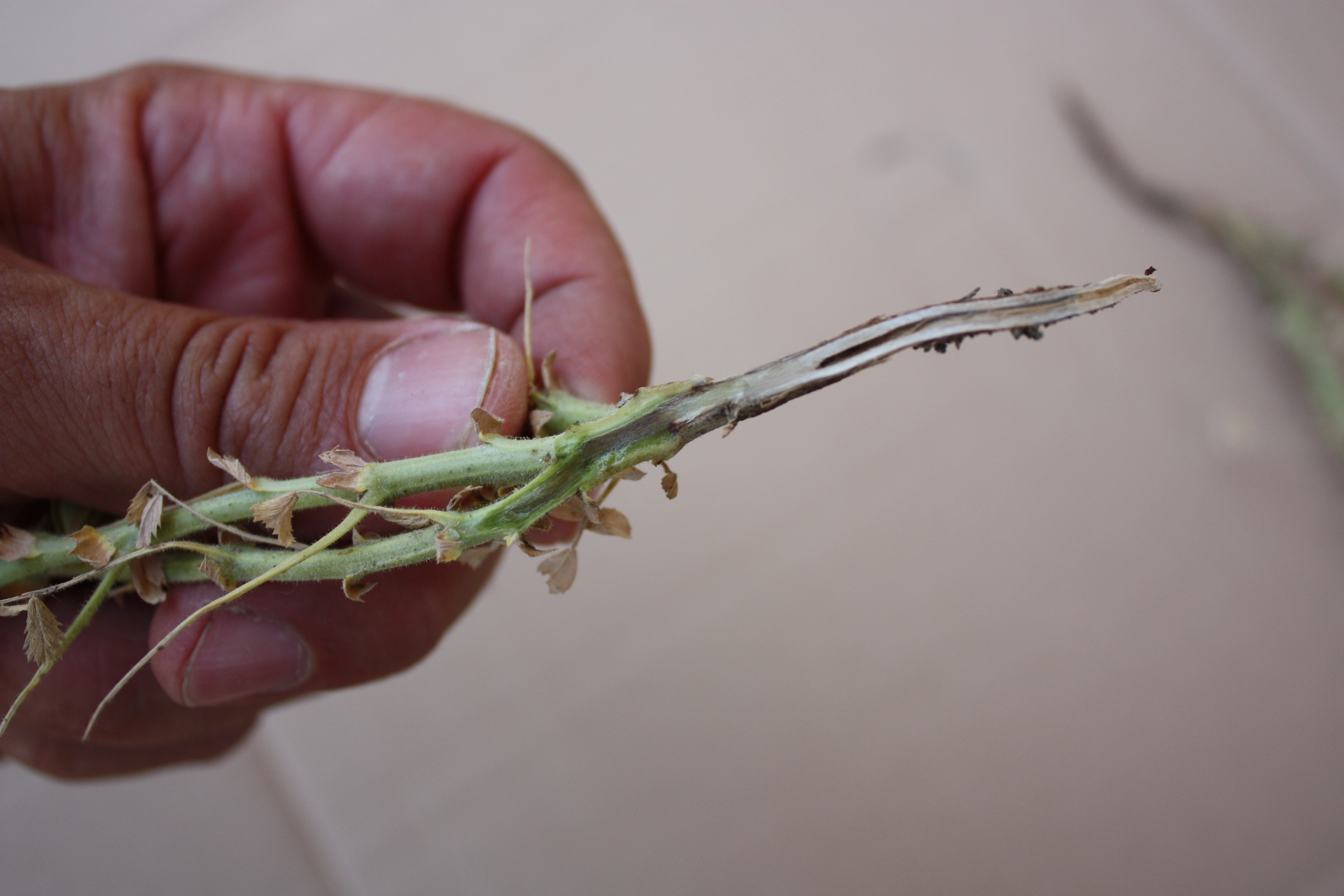
- Section of the taproot of a chickpea plant affected by Fusarium solani f.sp. pisi. Cortical reddening caused by the colonization of fungal hyphae

Scientific classification
- Kingdom: Fungi
- Division: Ascomycota
- Class: Sordariomycetes
- Order: Hypocreales
- Family: Nectriaceae
- Genus: Fusarium
- Species: F. solani
- Forma specialis: F. s. f.sp. pisi

Trionomial name
- Fusarium solani f.sp. pisi W.C. Snyder & H.N. Hansen, (1941)

Synonyms
- Fusarium martii var. pisi F.R. Jones, (1923); Fusarium solani f. pisi (F.R. Jones) W.C. Snyder & H.N. Hansen, (1941)

= Fusarium solani f.sp. pisi =

Fungal plant pathogen

Fusarium solani f.sp. pisi is a fungal plant pathogen infecting peas. The more appropriate name, reflecting the modern scope of Fusarium solani, is Fusarium pisi.
