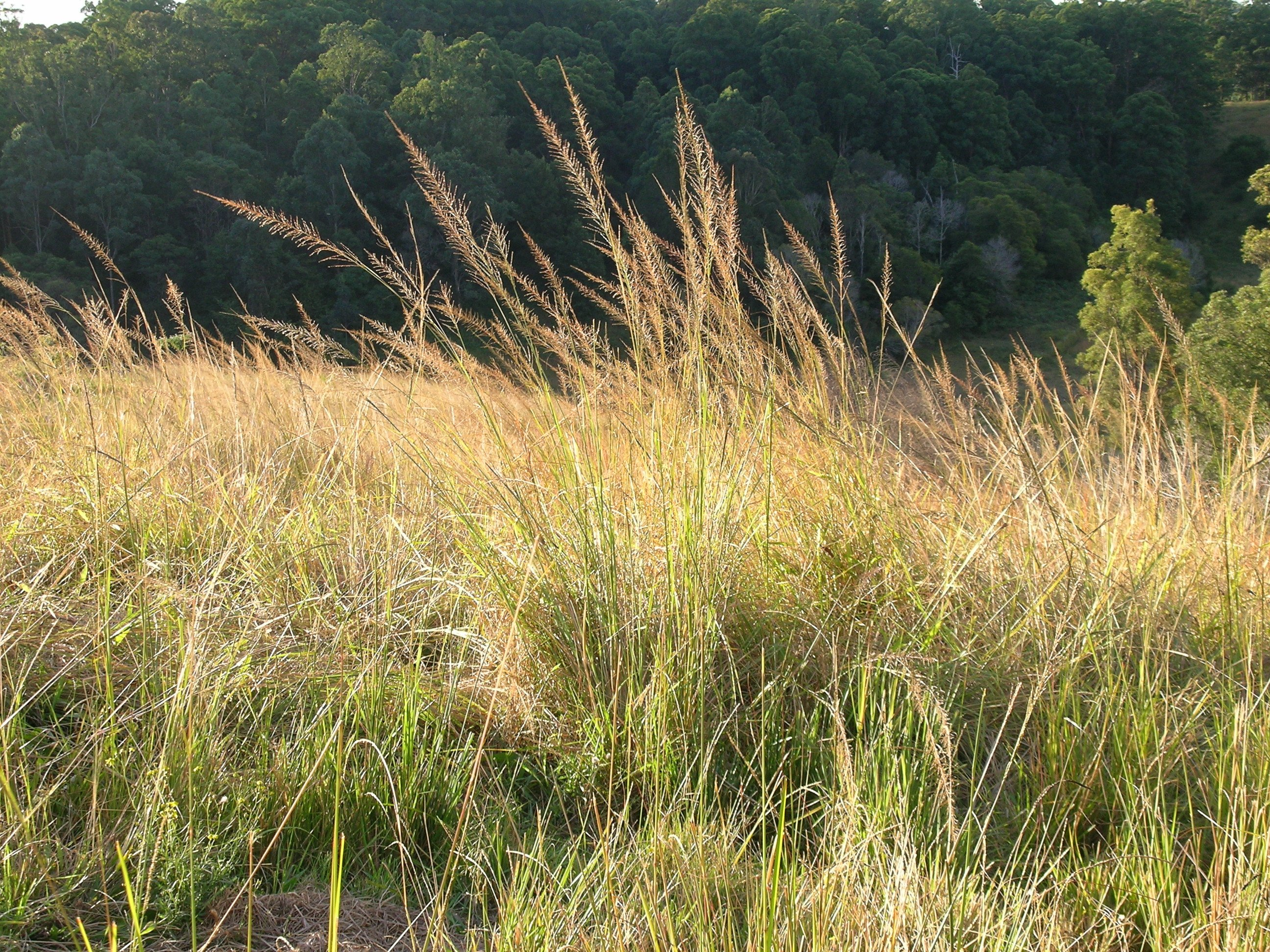

Scientific classification
- Kingdom: Plantae
- Clade: Tracheophytes
- Clade: Angiosperms
- Clade: Monocots
- Clade: Commelinids
- Order: Poales
- Family: Poaceae
- Subfamily: Chloridoideae
- Genus: Sporobolus
- Species: S. pyramidalis

Binomial name
- Sporobolus pyramidalis Beauv.

= Sporobolus pyramidalis =

Species of grass

Sporobolus pyramidalis is a species of grass native to Africa and Yemen. It does not have a distinct established English name, but it is one of the two species of giant rat's tail grasses. It has become a weed in eastern Australia.
