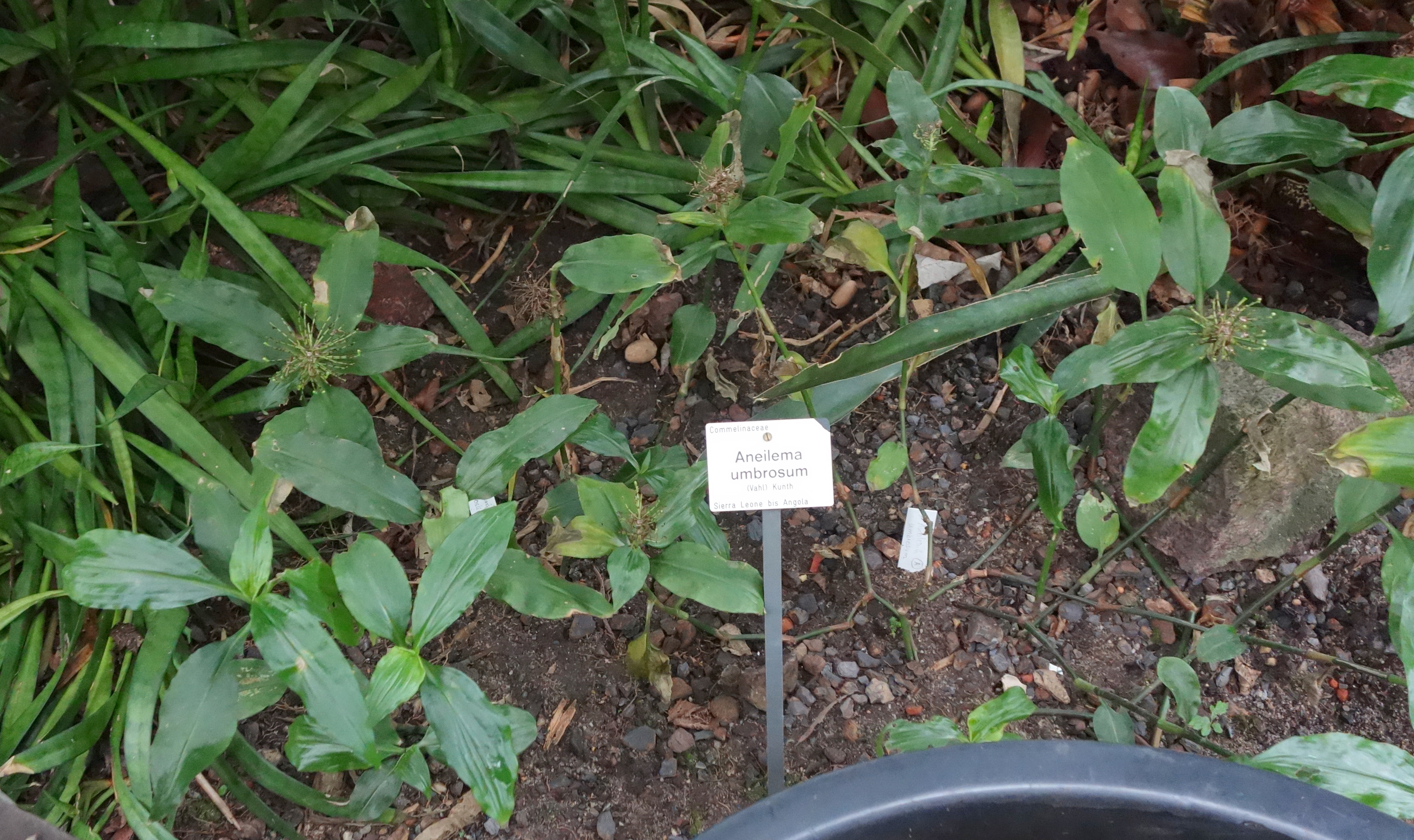

Scientific classification
- Kingdom: Plantae
- Clade: Tracheophytes
- Clade: Angiosperms
- Clade: Monocots
- Clade: Commelinids
- Order: Commelinales
- Family: Commelinaceae
- Genus: Aneilema
- Species: A. umbrosum

Binomial name
- Aneilema umbrosum (Vahl) Kunth

= Aneilema umbrosum =

Species of plant

Aneilema umbrosum (yungas, rain, chiquitano) is a species of plant in the family Commelinaceae.
