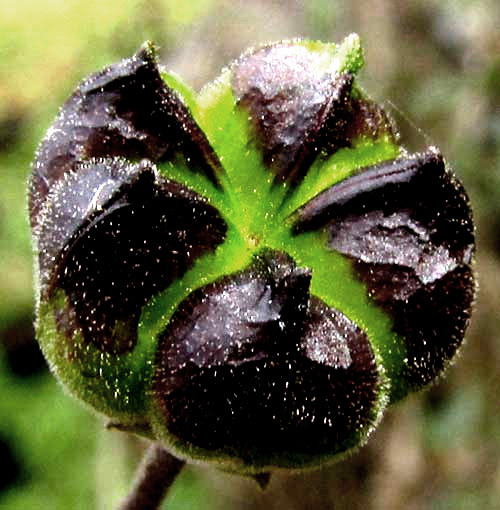
- Wissadula amplissima schizocarp with 5 hairy mericarps

Scientific classification
- Kingdom: Plantae
- Clade: Tracheophytes
- Clade: Angiosperms
- Clade: Eudicots
- Clade: Rosids
- Order: Malvales
- Family: Malvaceae
- Genus: Wissadula
- Species: W. amplissima

Binomial name
- Wissadula amplissima (L.) R.E.Fr.

Synonyms
- List: Abutilon amplissimum (L.) Kuntze; Sida amplissima L.; Wissadula amplissima var. typica R.E.Fr.; Abutilon chapelieri Baill.; Abutilon crinitum Klotzsch; Abutilon laxiflorum Guill. & Perr.; Abutilon polyanthon (Schltdl. ex Link) Sweet; Sida heterosperma Hochst. ex Mast.; Sida laxiflora Steud.; Sida paniculata Salzm. ex Triana & Planch.; Sida pauciflora D.Dietr.; Sida polyantha Schltdl. ex Link; Sida racemosa Vell.; Sida sundensis Spreng.; Sida tetracocca D.Dietr.; Wissadula amplissima f. lobulata R.E.Fr.; Wissadula heterosperma Hochst. ex Mast.; Wissadula hirsuta C.Presl

= Wissadula amplissima =

Species of plant

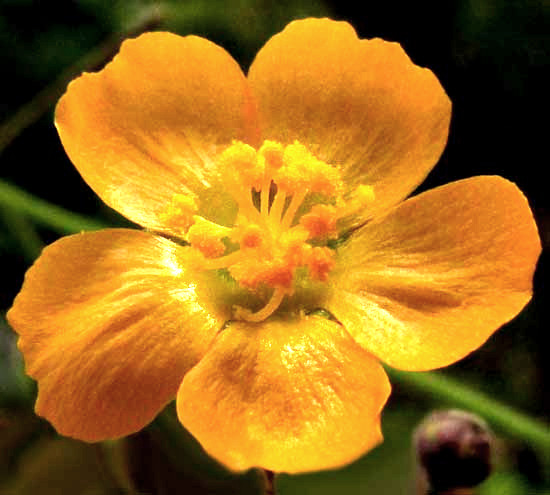
Flower

Wissadula amplissima, the big yellow velvetleaf, is a species of shrub native to the American tropics, including Mexico. It may also occur in Cape Verde and Tropical Africa, depending on whether the African plants are a variety of this species or Wissadula rostrata. It belongs to the family Malvaceae.

== Description ==
Big yellow velvetleaf is a large, hairy shrub with heart-shaped leaves and topped with a diffuse gathering of clusters of small flowers and fruits. Distinguishing the species from numerous similar ones is mainly a matter of noting features of the schizocarp-type fruits and flower color. Here are its key identification features:

- The shrubs are up to 3 m (10 ft) tall.
- Leaves have hairy petioles up to 16 cm (6 1/4 in) long and hairy, heart-shaped, velvety-feeling blades up to 20 cm (7 3/4 in) long, and nearly as wide. Blade margins bear no teeth or indentations, but may be wavy. Lobes at blade bases may overlap one another. The blades are much paler below than above.
- The flowering/fruiting part atop the plant consists of a complex system of inflorescences acting as a single unit, sometimes known as a "synflorescence." Within this grouping, individual small flowers are held in clusters of 2 or 3 at tips of long inflorescence branches, the structure thus appearing somewhat diffuse.
- Flowers have yellow corollas up to 11 mm (7/16 in) in diameter, and calyces up to 4 mm (3/16 in), which grow as the fruit develops.
- The schizocarp-type fruits, up to 1 cm (3/8 in) in diameter, split into divisions called "mericarps," with each mericarp producing 3 seeds. The mericarps are well distinct from one another and each is topped with a conspicuous point.

== Distribution ==
In the Americas, big yellow velvetleaf occurs throughout most of Mexico except for the drier areas, the Caribbean and south through Central America into Peru and most of Brazil in South America. Plants of the World Online places the species in tropical Africa, on the basis that the taxon known as Wissadula rostrata should be treated as a subspecies of Wissadula amplissima. A 2010 paper suggests that the African plants merit recognition as a distinct species.

== Habitat ==
In Mexico's Yucatan Peninsula, big yellow velvetleaf occurs in disturbed environments and dry forest with long dry seasons. In Brazil it is found in semi-arid tropical vegetation (Caatinga), Atlantic Forest (Mata Atlântica), tropical lowland (Pantanal), and forest edges in general.

== Human uses ==
=== In traditional medicine ===
In the Ashanti Region of Ghana, big yellow velvetleaf's variety rostrata (sometimes considered the species W. rostrata) is used to treat stings of spiders, wasps and bees. Laboratory analysis of extracts of powdered dried leaves of the species gave "... scientific credence to the local use of Wissadula amplissima to modulate inflammation induced by stings of animals."

=== For fiber ===
In Mexico, fiber sometimes is extracted from the stems of Wissadula amplissima.

== Taxonomy ==
In 1753, Carl Linnaeus formally described and named Wissadula amplissima under the basionym Sida amplissima.

In 1908 when the current name Wissadula amplissima was published by Robert Elias Fries, he recognized the variety typica of the Americas, and the variety rostrata of Africa, in the process designating both the names W. hernandioides and W. rostrata as synonyms for W. amplissima var. rostrata.

Note that some sources regard Wissadula amplissima as a synonym of Wissadula hernandioides, with both names authored by (L’ Hér.) Garcke. But here the Wissadula amplissima being treated is authored by (L.) R.E.Fr.. Moreover, some authors regard our Wissadula amplissima (L.) R. E. Fr. as a synonym of Wissadula hernandioides (L'Hér.) Garcke.

=== Etymology ===
The genus name Wissadula is thought to be based on the Sinhalese words wissa, meaning "poison" and duvili, meaning "dust or powder." The resulting name wissaduli was used for the plant Centipeda minima but in 1787 was misapplied here when Friedrich Kasimir Medikus erected the genus.

The species name amplissima is from Latin, an adjective of the 1st declension, meaning "great, large, spacious, wide, ample," and more. This refers to the leaf's width, maybe because the species has the largest leaves among the genus Sida, to which formerly the taxon belonged.

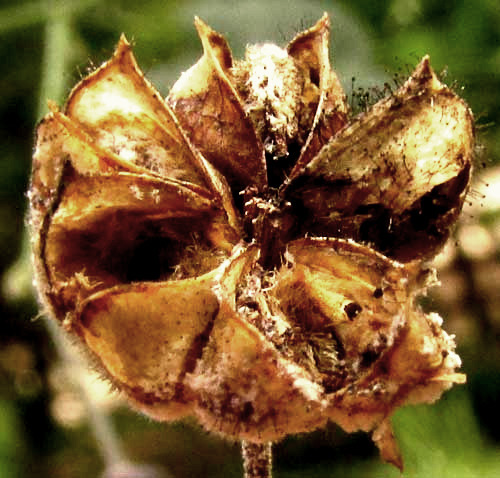
Schizocarp with 5 split mericarps

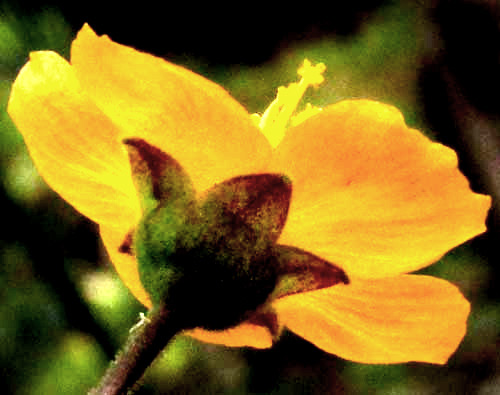
Calyx below flower

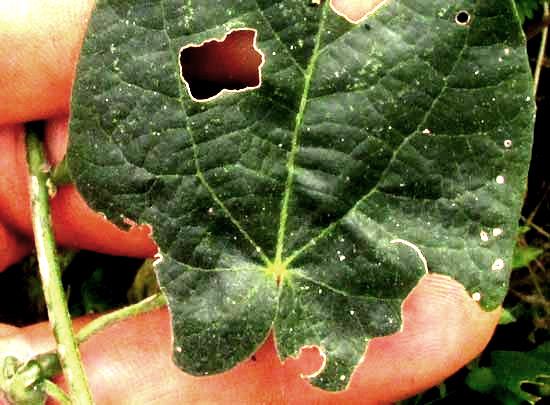
Bug-eaten leaf base with 2 lobes

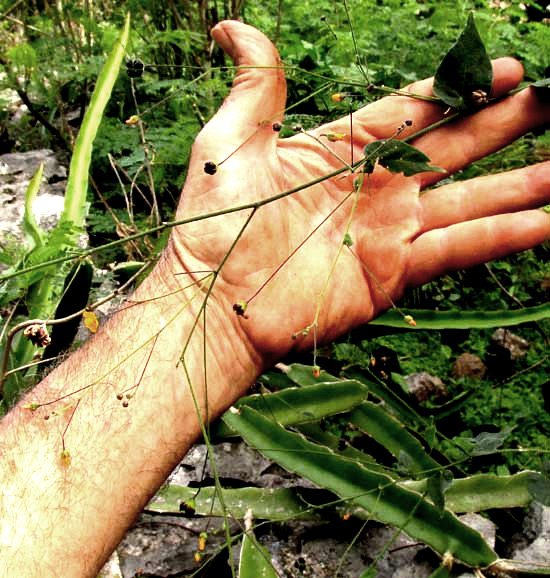
Diffuse part of the synflorescence

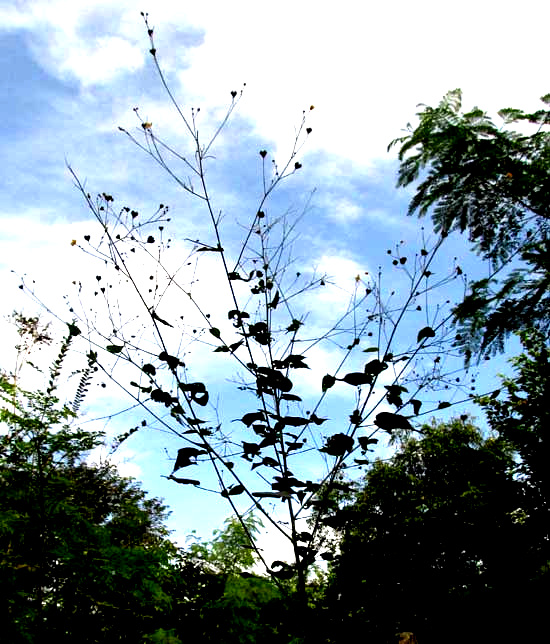
Upper part of plant in habitat
