= Tourism in Ghana =

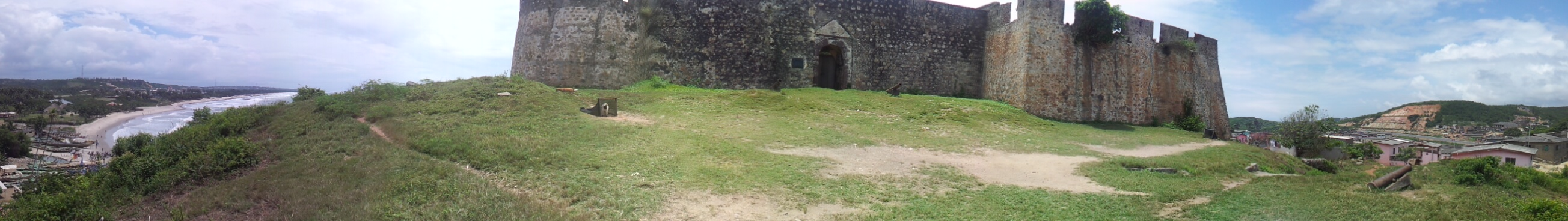
Panorama view of Fort Amsterdam, Ghana in the Central region of Ghana on the Gulf of Guinea and Atlantic Ocean

Tourism in Ghana is regulated by the Ministry of Tourism, Arts & Culture. This ministry is responsible for the development and promotion of tourism related activities in Ghana.

== Tourist attractions and statistics ==
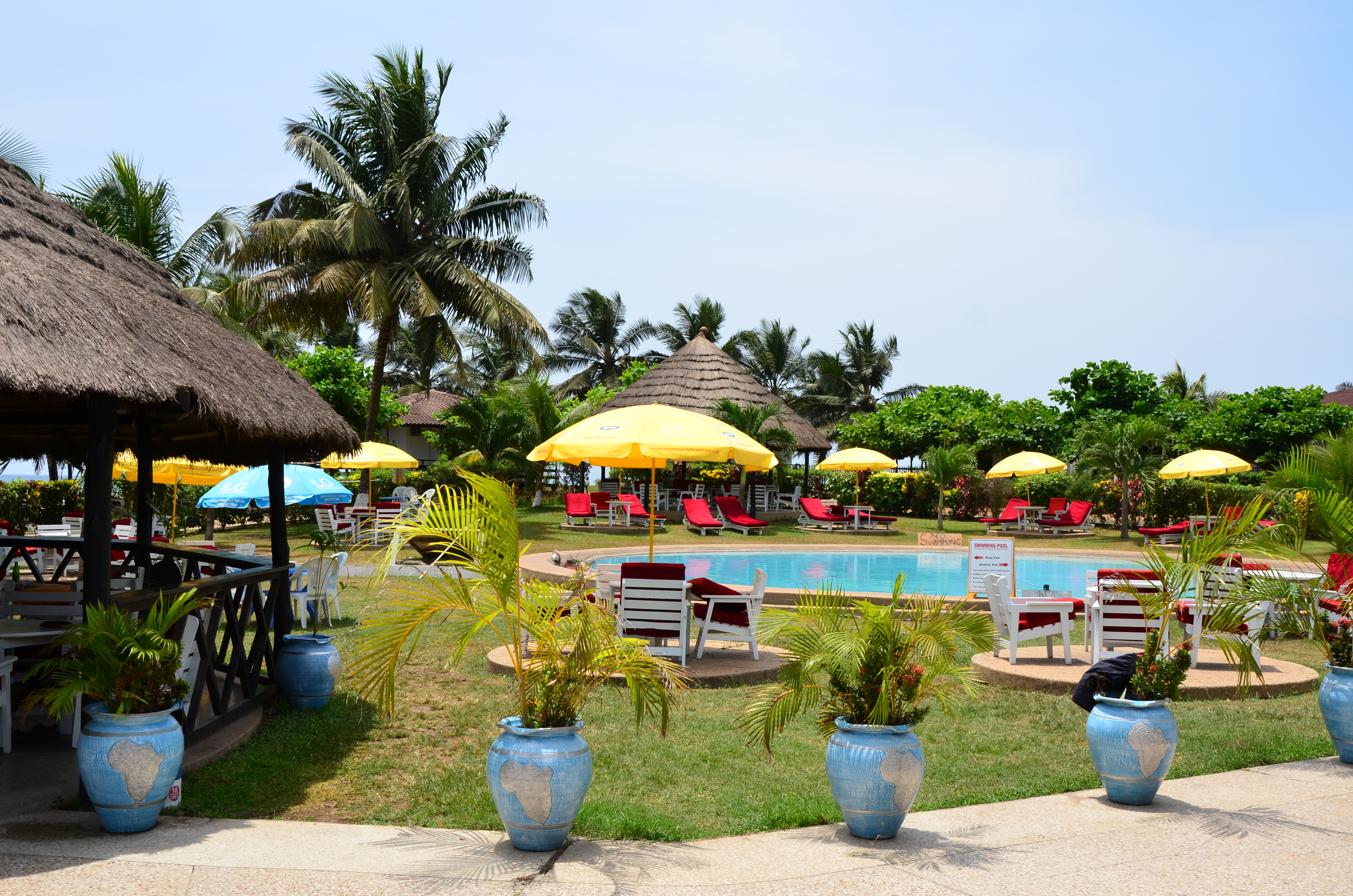
Beach resort in Sekondi-Takoradi, Western region

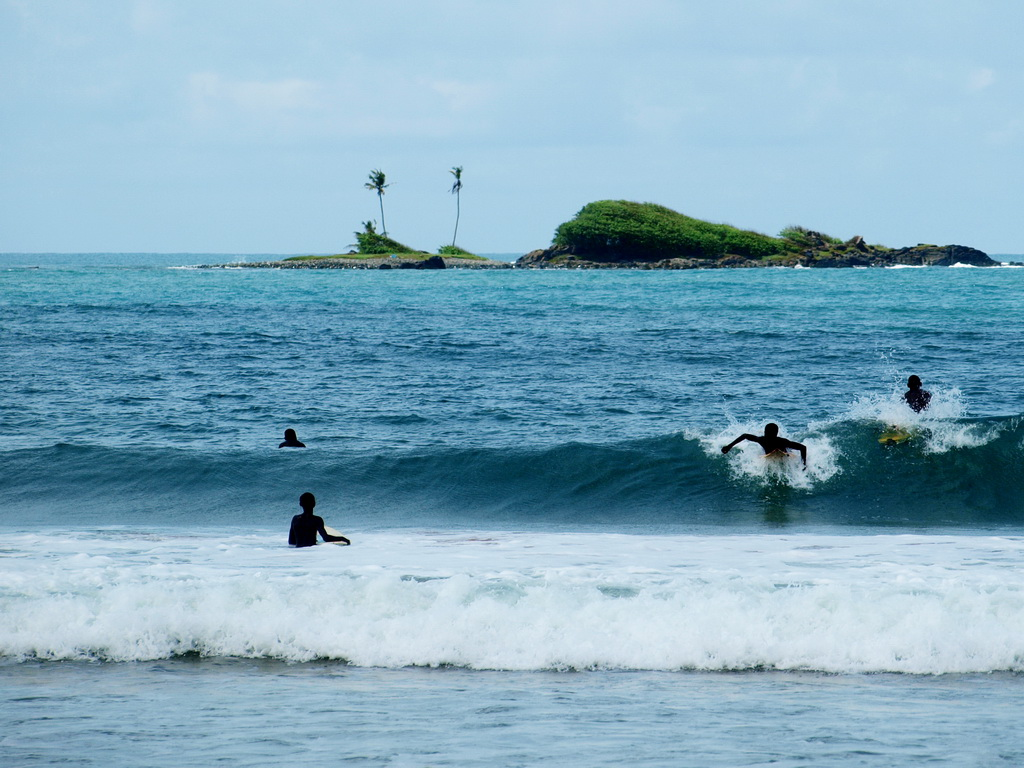
Surfers at Busua Beach in Western region

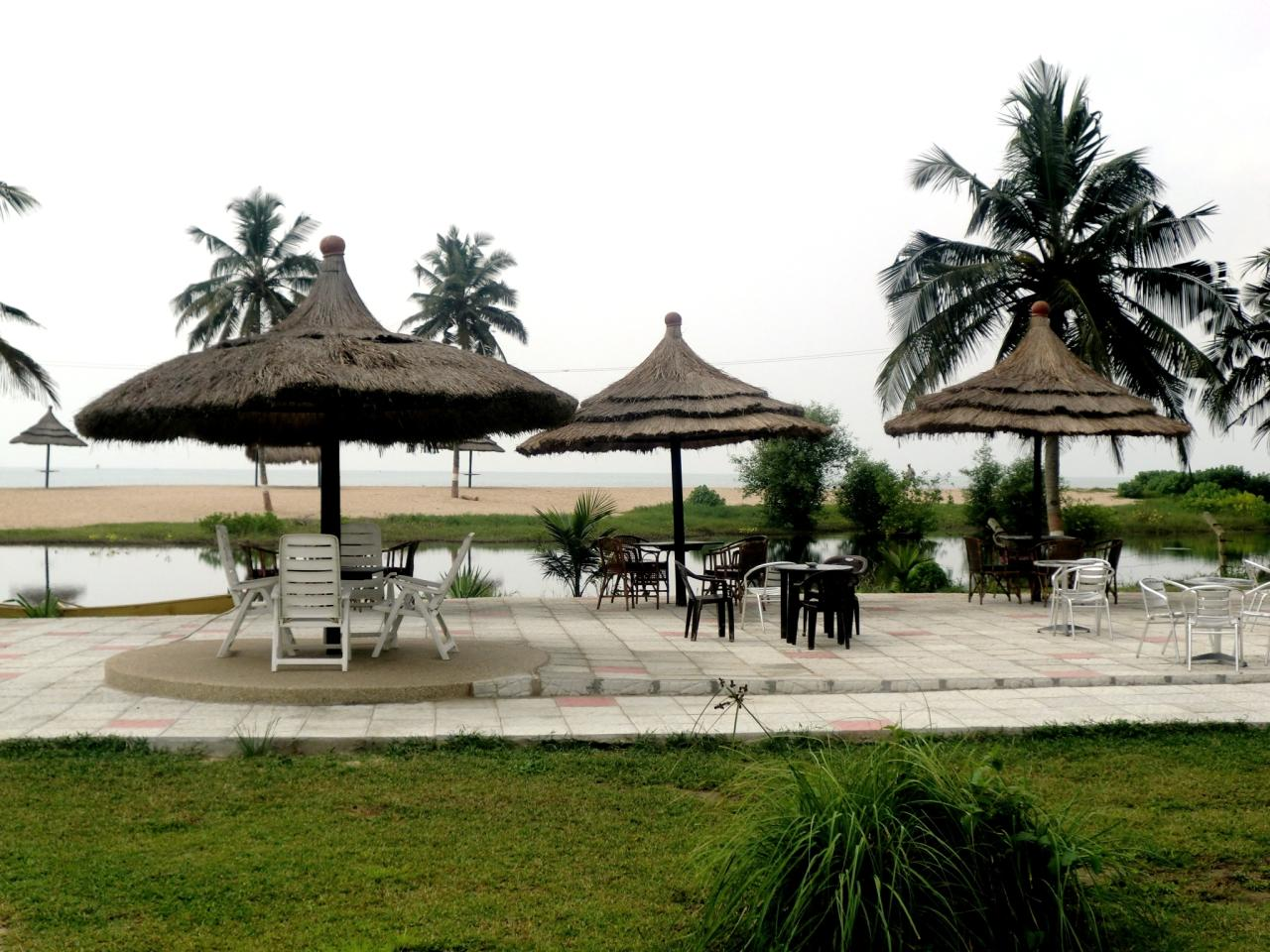
Busua Beach resort setting in Western region

Tourist arrivals to Ghana include visitors from South and Latin America, Asia and Europe.It has waterfalls such as Kintampo waterfalls and the Tagbo Falls along with palm-lined sandy beaches, caves, mountains, rivers, castles, forts, UNESCO World Heritage Sites, nature reserves and national parks.

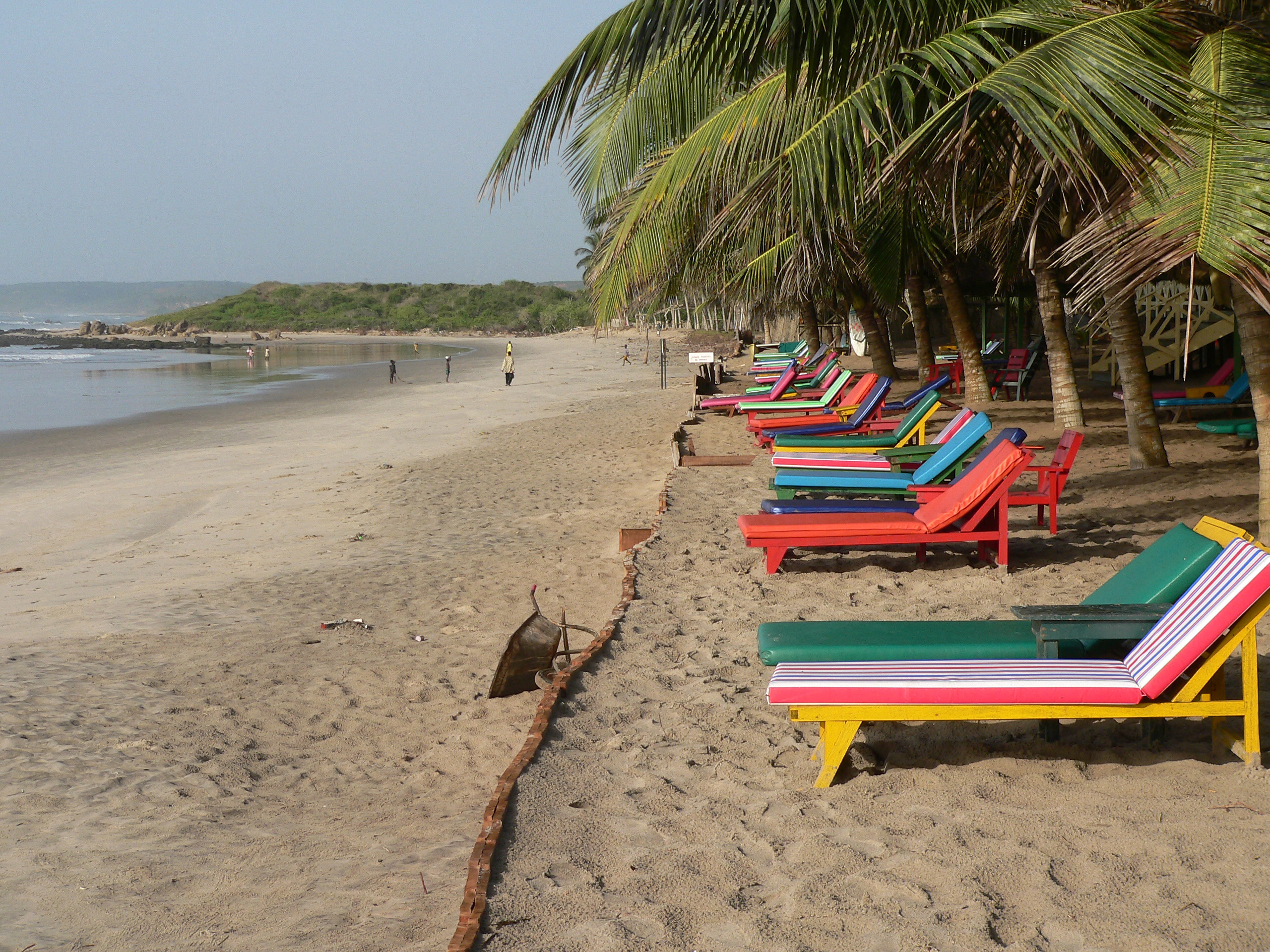
Beach resort and seaside resort setting in Central region.

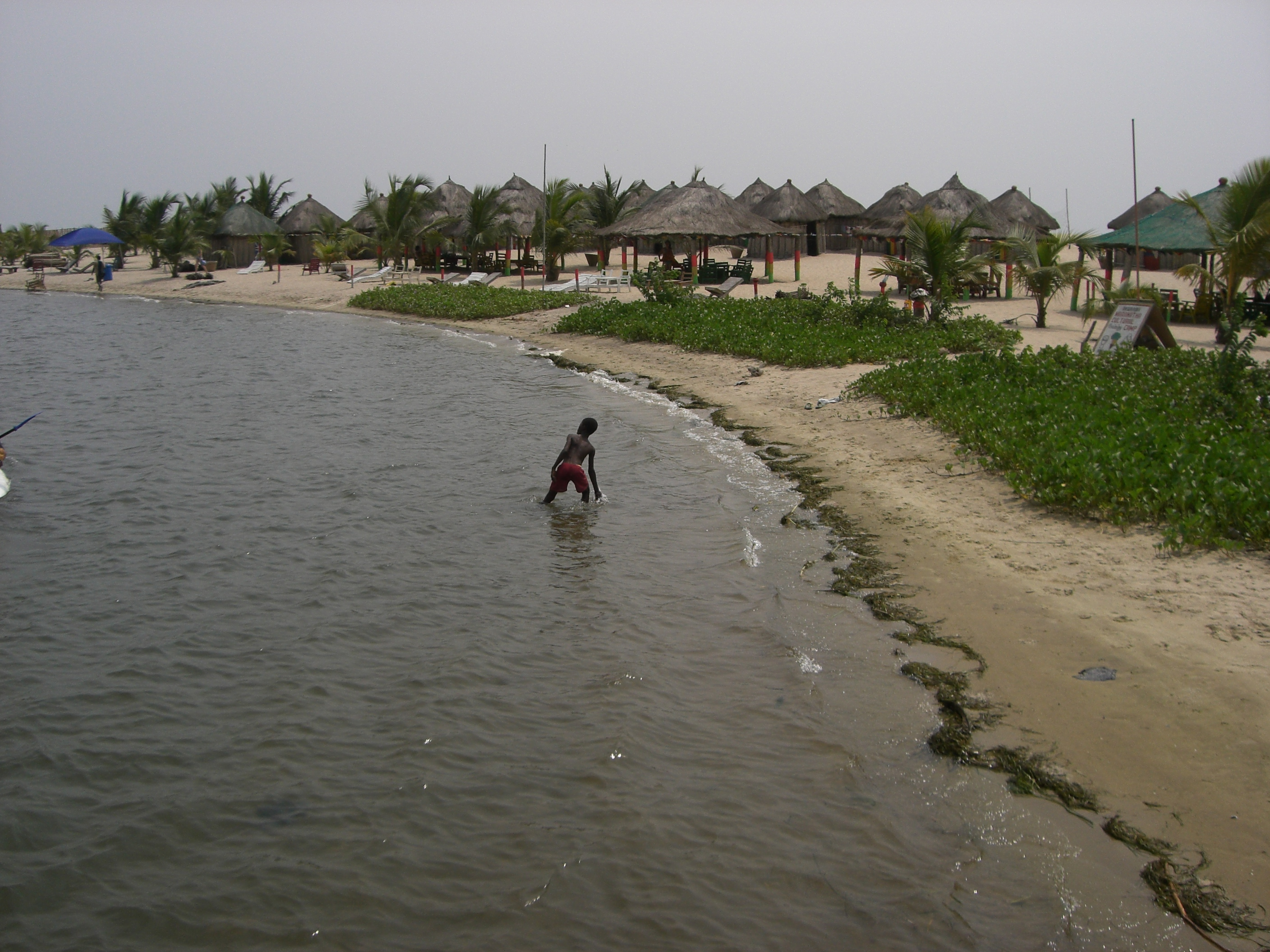
Beach resort and seaside resort setting at Ada Foah in Greater Accra.

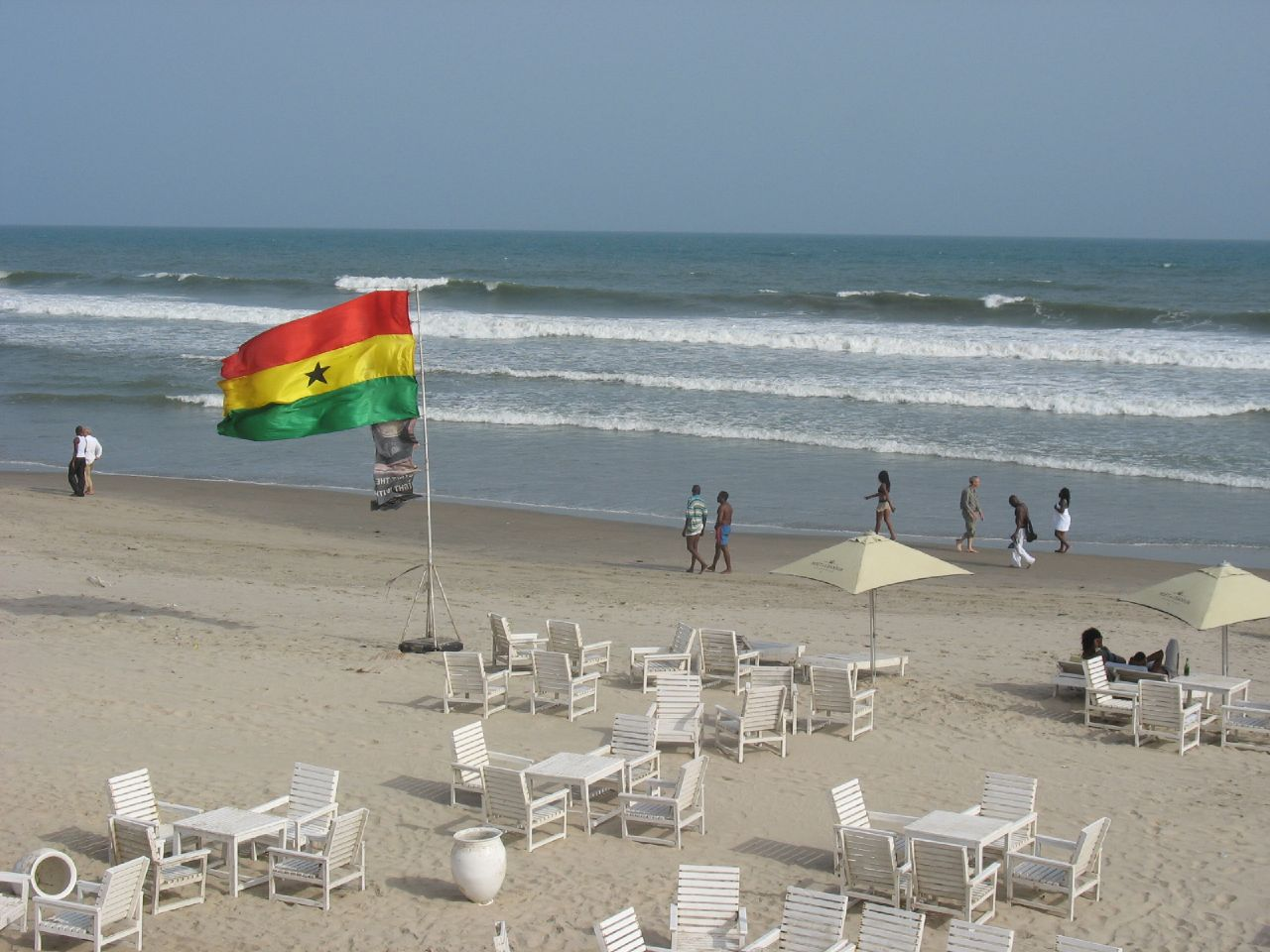
Beach setting in Greater Accra.

The World Economic Forum statistics in 2010 showed that Ghana was ranked 108th out of 139 countries as the world's favourite tourism destination. The country had moved two places up from the 2009 rankings. In 2011, Forbes Magazine, published that Ghana was ranked the eleventh-most friendly country in the world. The assertion was based on a survey conducted in 2010 of a cross-section of travelers. Of all the African countries that were included in the survey, Ghana ranked highest. Ghana ranks as the seventieth-most stable country in the world and as the 58th–most peaceful country in the world.

In 2011, Ghana made $2.19 billion ($2,019,000,000) from the tourism sector, from an estimated 1.1 million international tourist arrivals. In 2012, Ghana's tourism sector made $1.7 billion from 993,600 international tourists, providing employment for 359,000 people. Ghana will annually make US$8.3 billion from the tourism sector per year by the year 2027, on the back of an estimated 4.3 million international tourist arrivals.

To enter Ghana, it is necessary to have a visa authorized by the Government of Ghana, except for certain business incubators and business magnates who are on business trips.

Ghana welcomed 1,288,804 international visitors in 2024, a 12% increase over 2023, according to the Ghana Tourism Authority's 2024 Tourism Report.

== Heritage tourism ==
Heritage tourism in Ghana is led by a festival called the Pan-African Historical Festival or PANAFEST. The festival is a cultural event with the intention of increasing the notion of Pan-Africanism and African development. It consists of the festival itself as well as the celebration surrounding Emancipation Day. PANAFEST primarily takes place in two cities, Elmina and Cape Coast, which were the largest slave-trading forts in the nation. The festival takes place over eight to nine days and begins with a ceremonial wreath laying. Events during PANAFEST include carnival day, a journey of return from those located in other nations, Rita Marley's birthday, an academic lecture on the women and youth, a naming ceremony from people from the diaspora, and finally the "Reverential Night".

PANAFEST is a direct manifestation of Ghanaian culture. It is also the appropriation of it and capitalization by the Rawlings administration. Indeed, Rawlings' developed international cultural festivals (including PANAFEST) are sources of income for Ghana.

== Appropriated beginnings ==
Before the Jerry Rawlings administration in 1981, tourism in Ghana was not an effective source of income for the Ghanaian society and was thus a missed opportunity in helping to diversify the Ghanaian economy. The Rawlings administration appropriated the Ghanaian culture and used it as a source of revenue. Through the restoration of castles that were once used for the slave industry, establishment of public memorials honouring the "illustrious sons" of Ghana, coupled with encouragement from the government via incentives for private investments, the Rawlings administration was able to push tourism forward with the cost of capitalizing on Ghanaian culture.

The tourist industry in Ghana is known to promote sustainable tourism that includes: cultural tourism, heritage tourism, recreational tourism, adventure tourism and event tourism. Cultural tourism focuses on festivals and events, whereas heritage tourism focuses on the history of the slave routes. Recreational tourism allows tourists to explore beaches and theme parks. Adventure tourism takes a look at rain forests and game parks, and event tourism focuses on resources and conferences.

Many of the heritage tourism sites highlight the legacy of the African Diaspora and the social composition of communities. As a result, these studies have impacted the tourists' connection to the heritage tourism sites by providing cultural depth to their trading experience.

== Significance to national development ==
Tourism is noted to be a significant contributor to Ghana's economic growth and development. For several years, Ghana has generated huge sums of revenue from the tourism sector; most especially during the 2019 Year of Return. Tourism generates foreign exchange earnings which boosts up the economy and also facilitates infrastructural development. This sector creates jobs and stimulates local/informal economies.

== Transportation and traveling in Ghana ==
In Ghana, various methods of transportation are used by tourists. The Tro tro is one method of transportation that usually uses a minivan and are used to travel in Ghana. The "hurry cars" are private cars that have set destinations and wait for passengers that are going to the set destination of the hurry car. They are typically found by transport stations and is definitely a more comfortable method of travel as opposed to a Tro Tro. The drivers of hurry cars will usually hold signs or give some type of information letting passengers know the destination they are set to go.

Uber, Bolt and Yango are the major ride-hailing services available.

== Major tourist sites ==
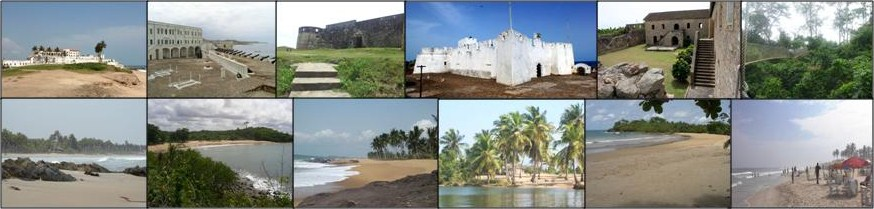
Tourism destinations in Ghana

- Aburi Botanical Gardens – Aburi Botanical Gardens features a diverse collection of tropical plants and is a popular spot for picnics and nature walks
- Kakum National Park – Kakum National Park offers opportunities for hiking and wildlife viewing in the rainforest
- Digya National Park – Digya National Park is home to a rich array of wildlife, including elephants, hippos, crocodiles, antelopes, monkeys, buffalo, warthogs, and numerous bird species.
- Mole National Park – Mole National Park is home to elephants, antelopes, baboons, and various bird species.
- Ankasa National park – Ankasa National Park is home to an impressive array of wildlife, including various primate species, mammals, and numerous bird species, including the endangered yellow-headed picathartes.
- Cape Coast Castle – UNESCO World Heritage Site
- Elmina Castle – UNESCO World Heritage Site
- Nzulezo – UNESCO World Heritage Site
- Bonwire – home of Asante kente cloth
- Shai Hills Resource Reserve – a resource reserve
- Lake Bosomtwi – a natural lake
- Kintampo waterfalls – waterfalls
- Boabeng Fiema Monkey Sanctuary – village where monkeys are revered
- Larabanga Mosque – one of the oldest in Ghana
- Kwame Nkrumah Mausoleum – refurbished and reopened in July 2023
- Lake Volta
- Wli Waterfalls
- Paga Crocodile Pond
- National Museum of Ghana
- Fort Metal Cross
- W.E.B. Du Bois Memorial Center
- Ada Foah
- Tafi Atome Monkey Sanctuary

=== Gallery ===
Tourism sites in Ghana
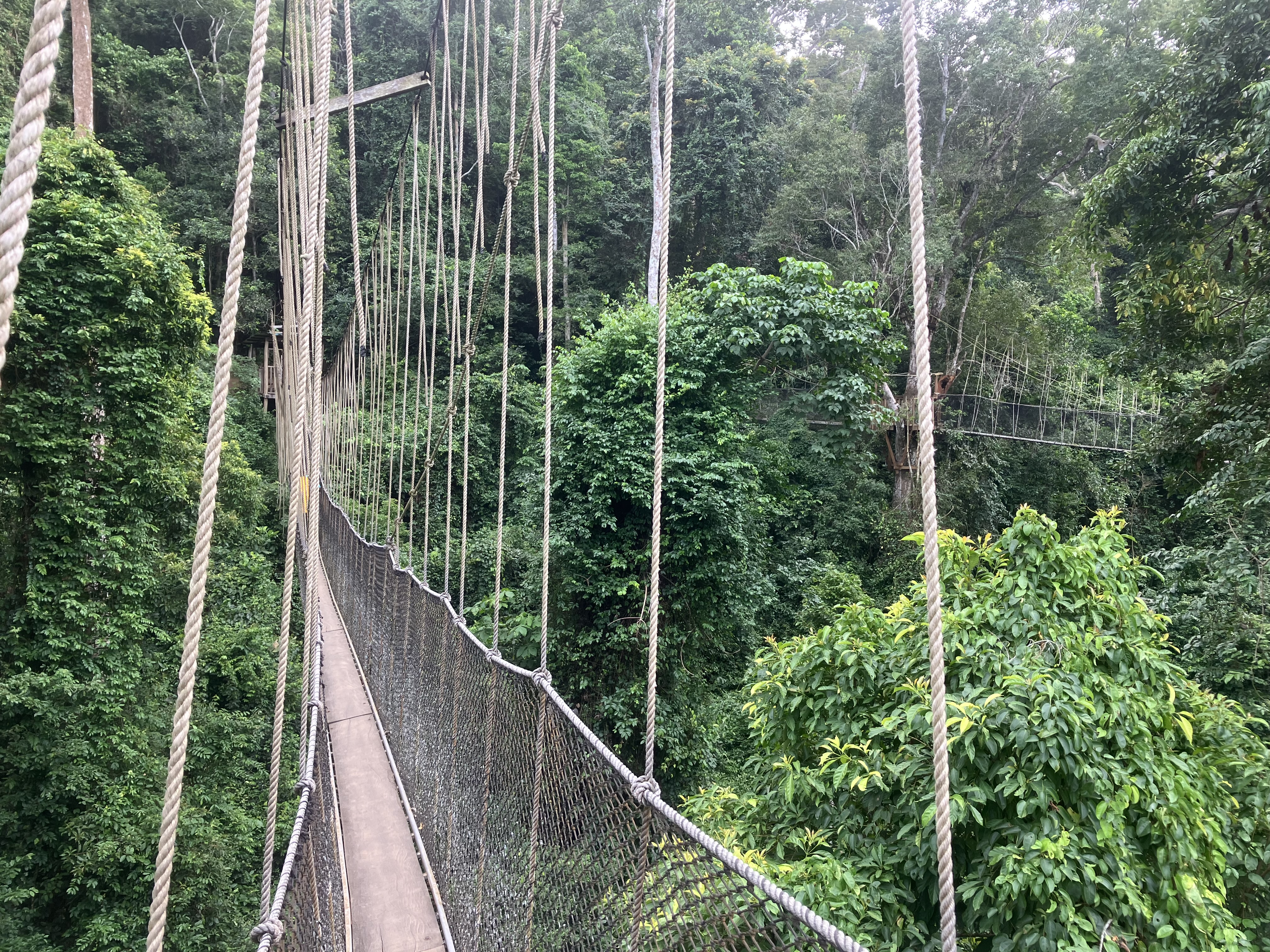
Kakum National Park – National Park

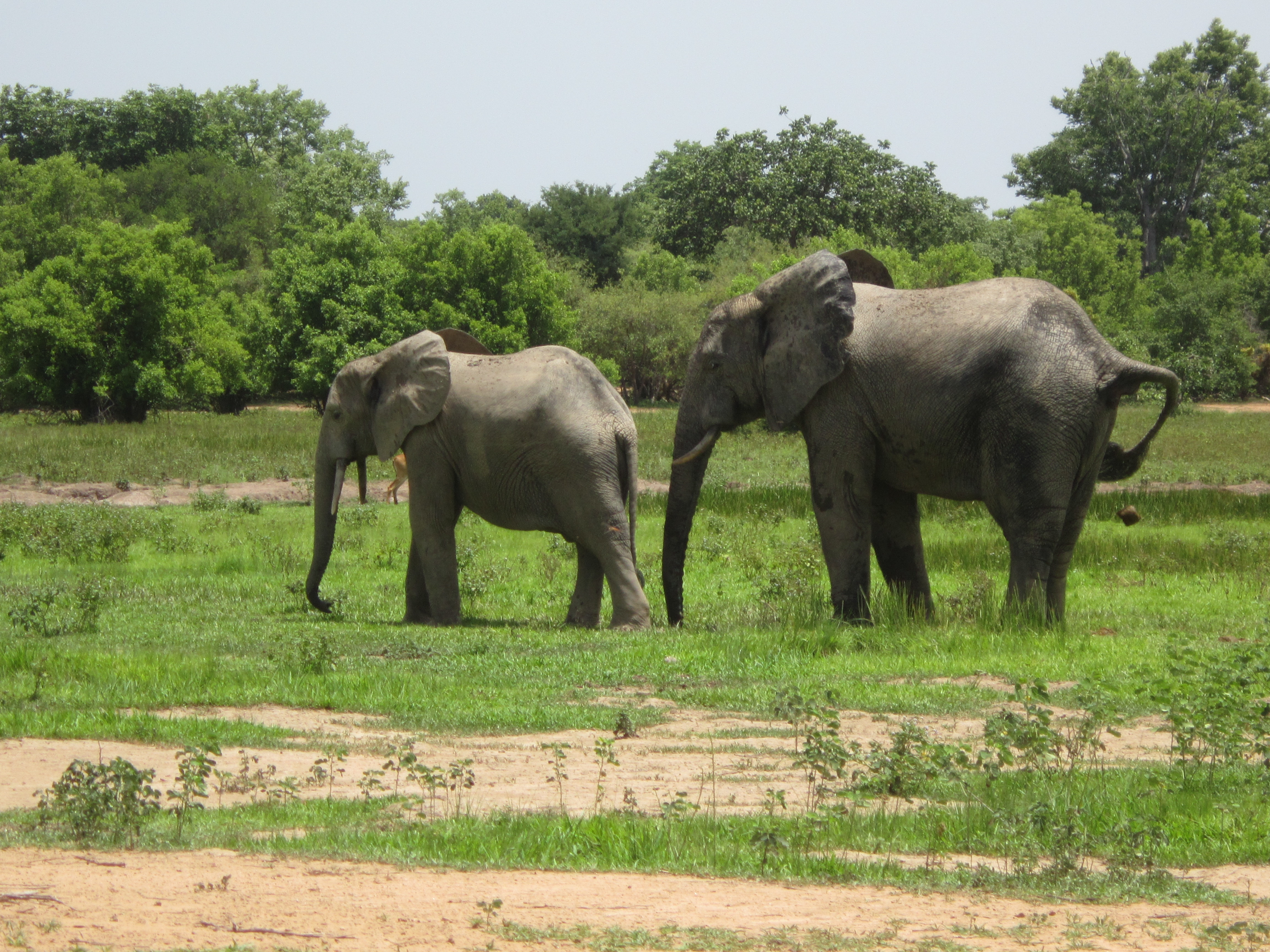
Mole National Park – National Park

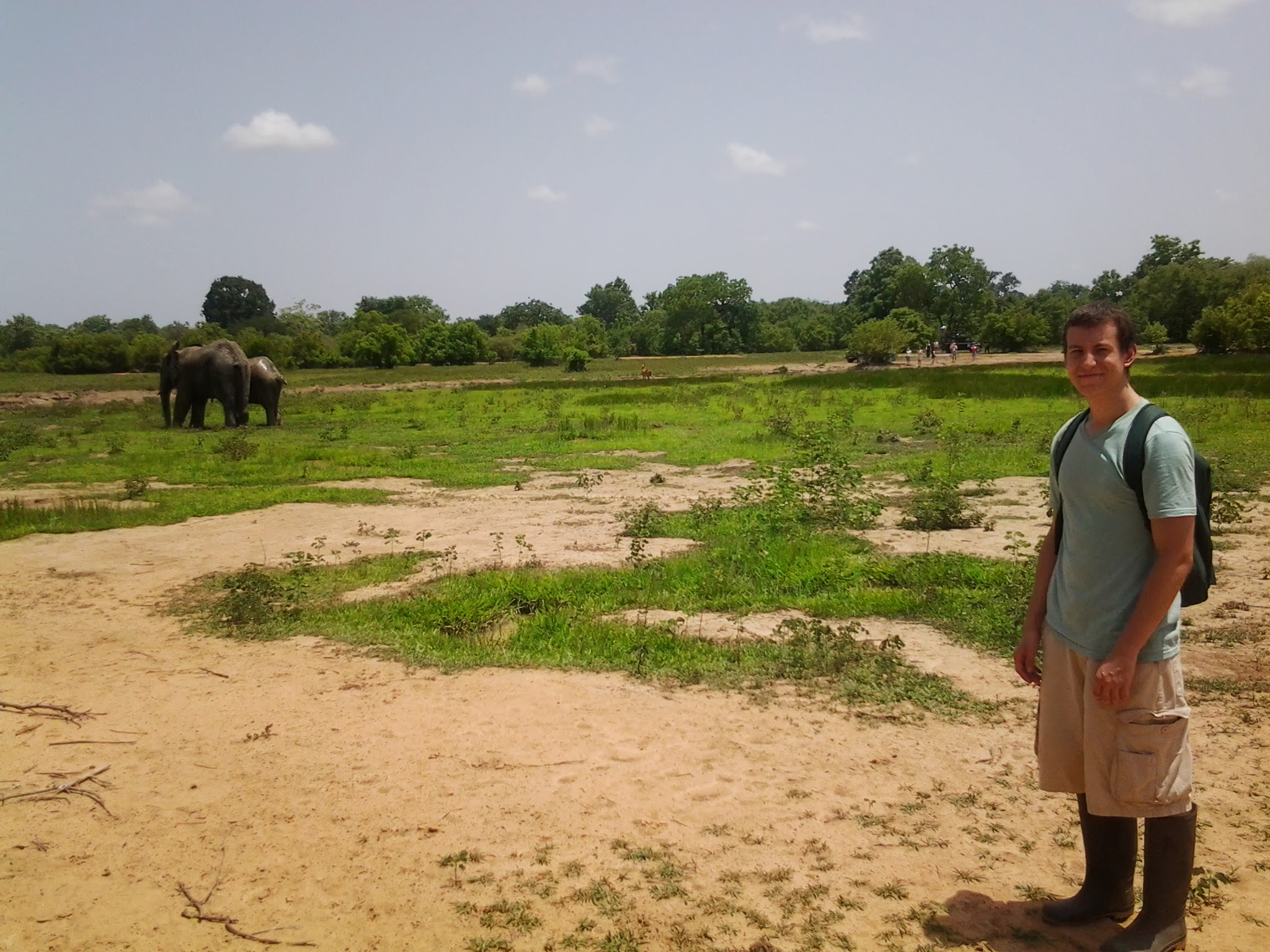
Mole National Park Tourism in Ghana

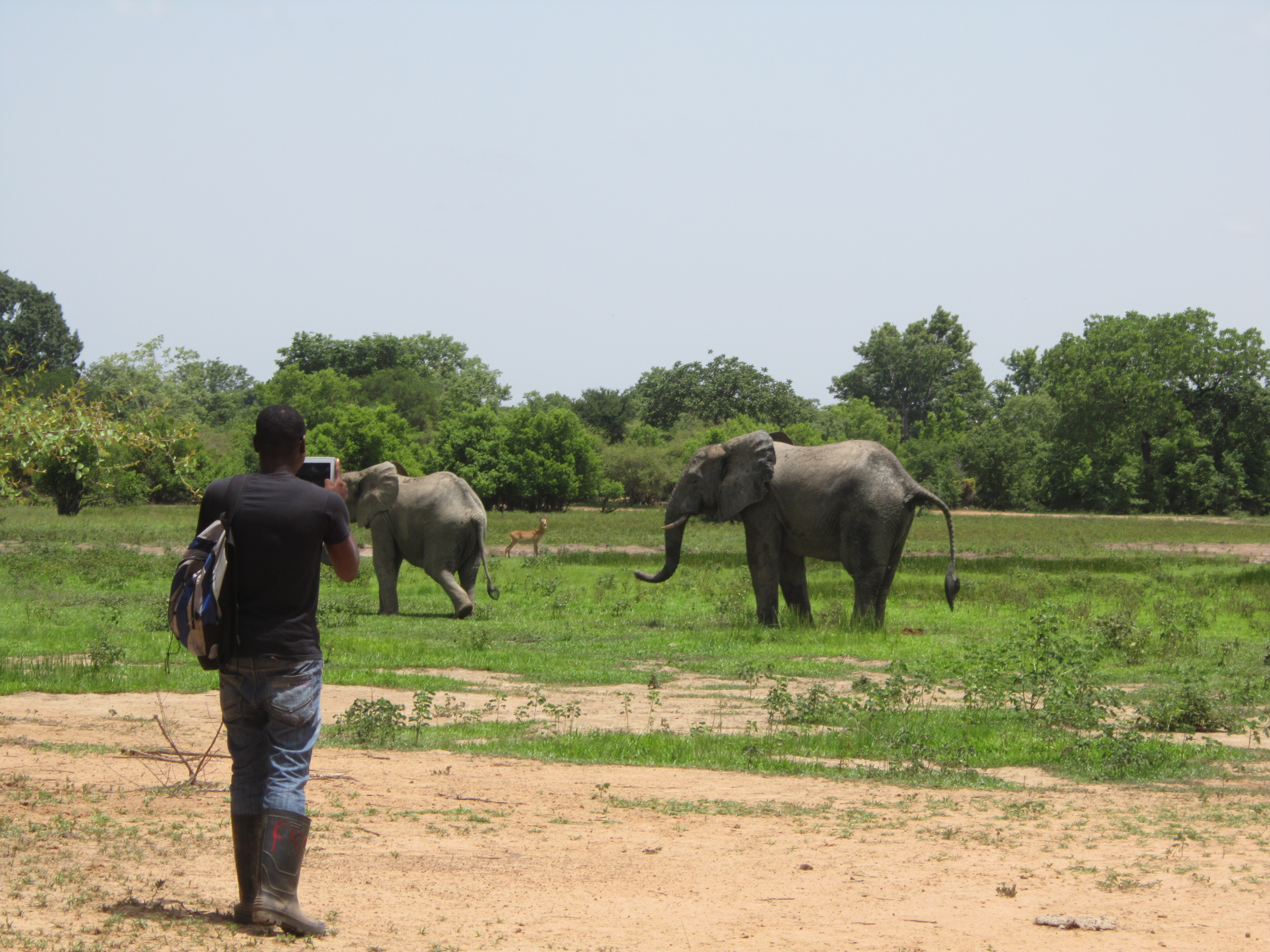
Tourist taking photo of elephants with iPad at Mole National Park in Ghana.

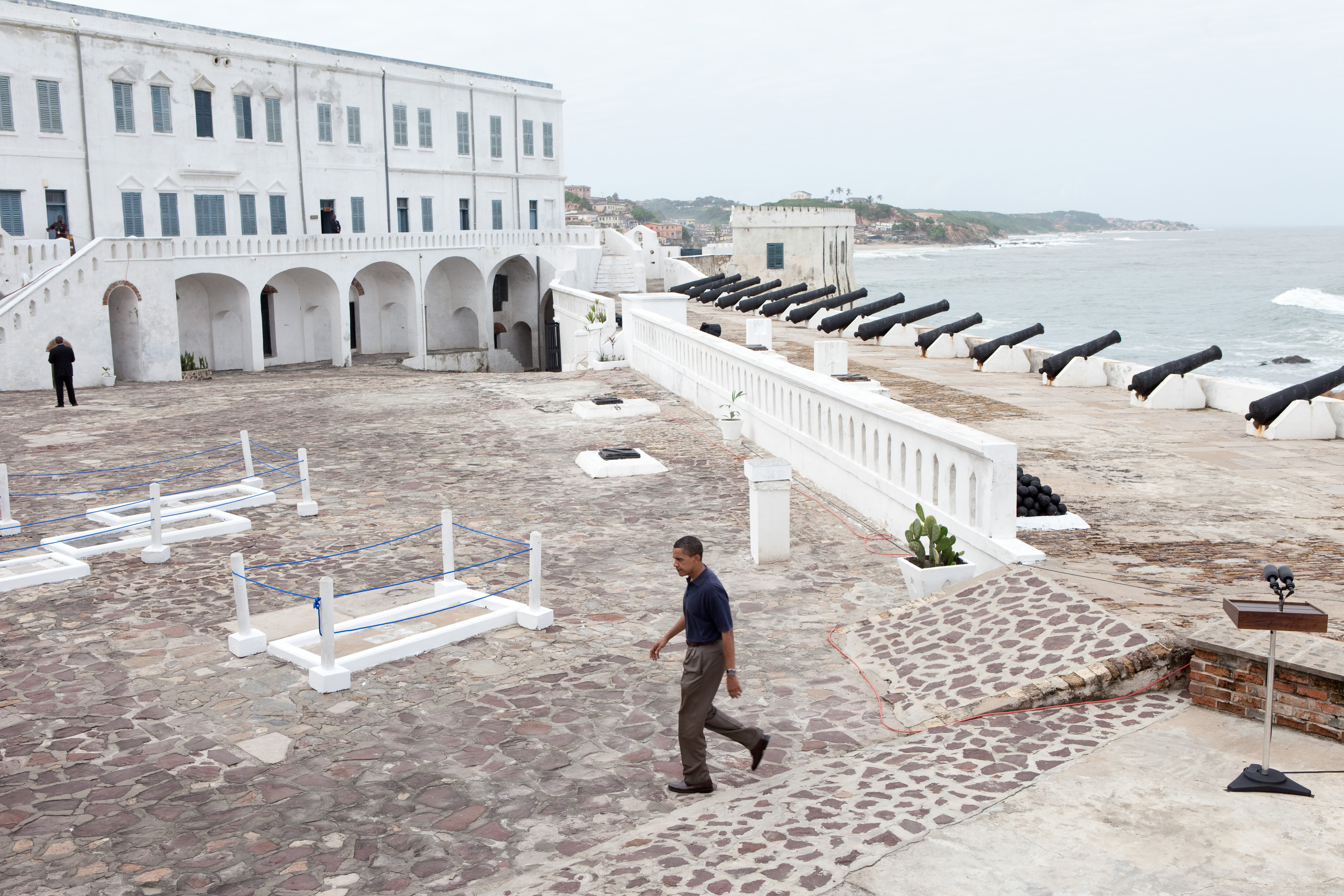
Cape Coast Castle – UNESCO World Heritage Site.

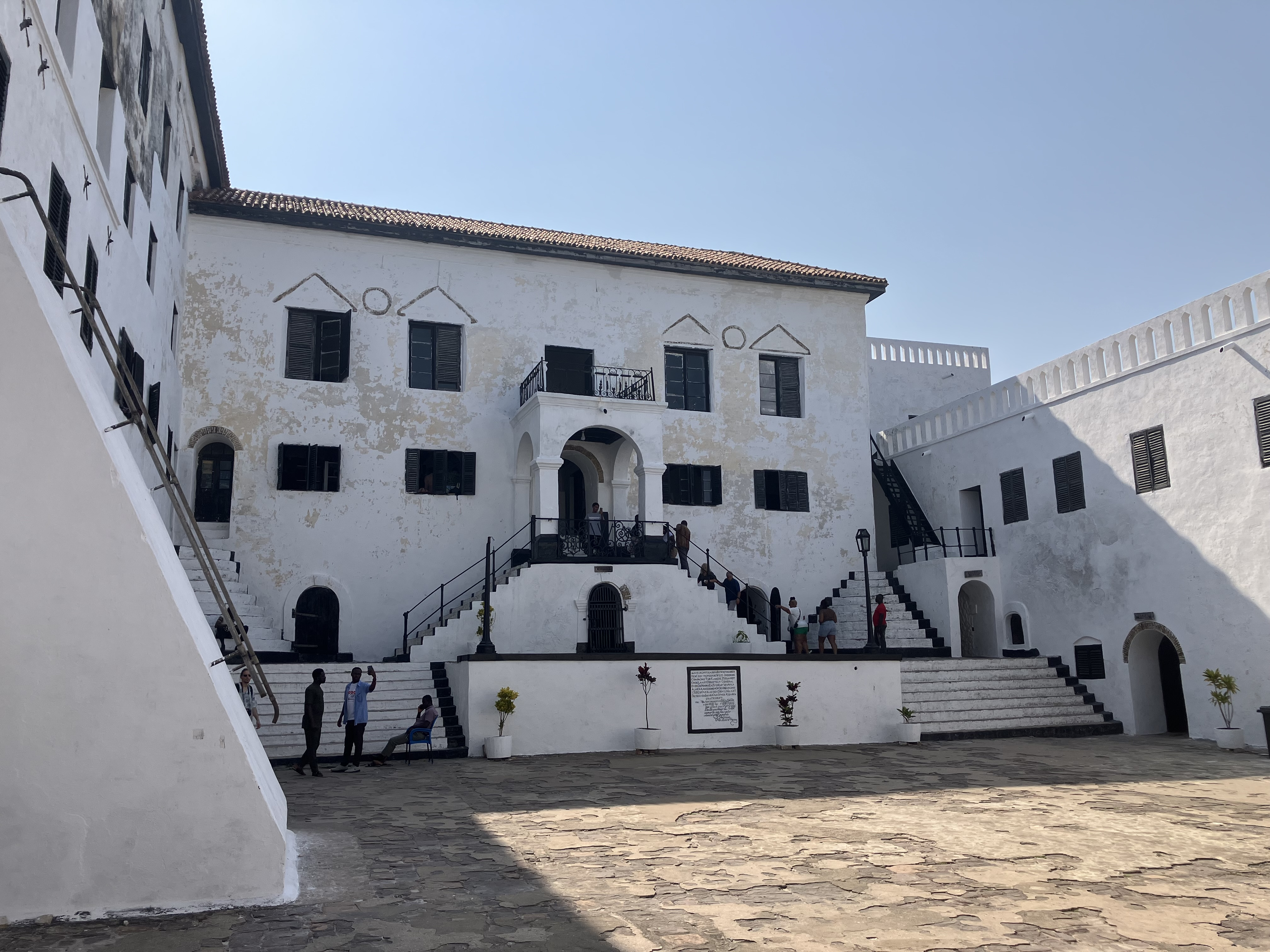
Elmina Castle – UNESCO World Heritage Site.

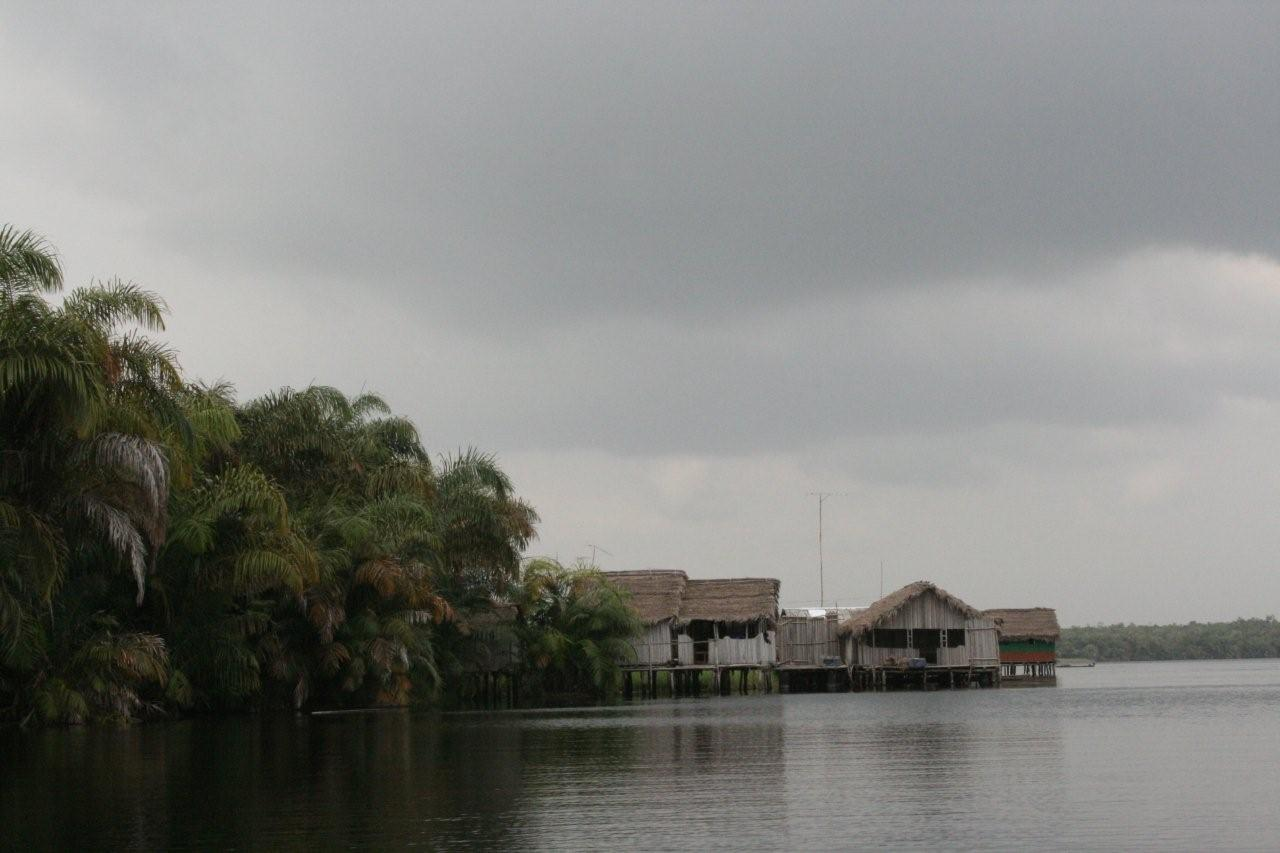
Nzulezo – UNESCO World Heritage Site.

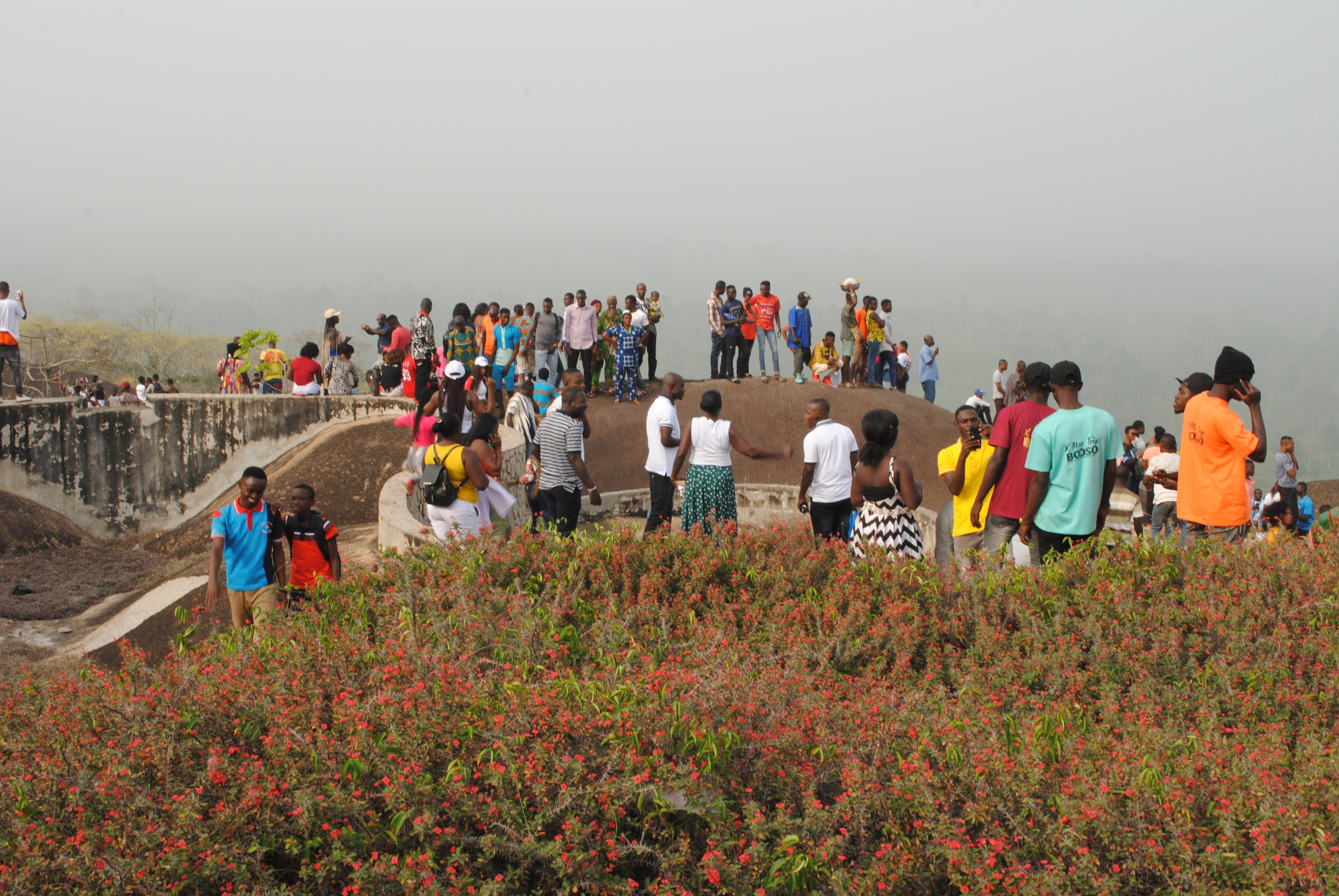
Mim Bour

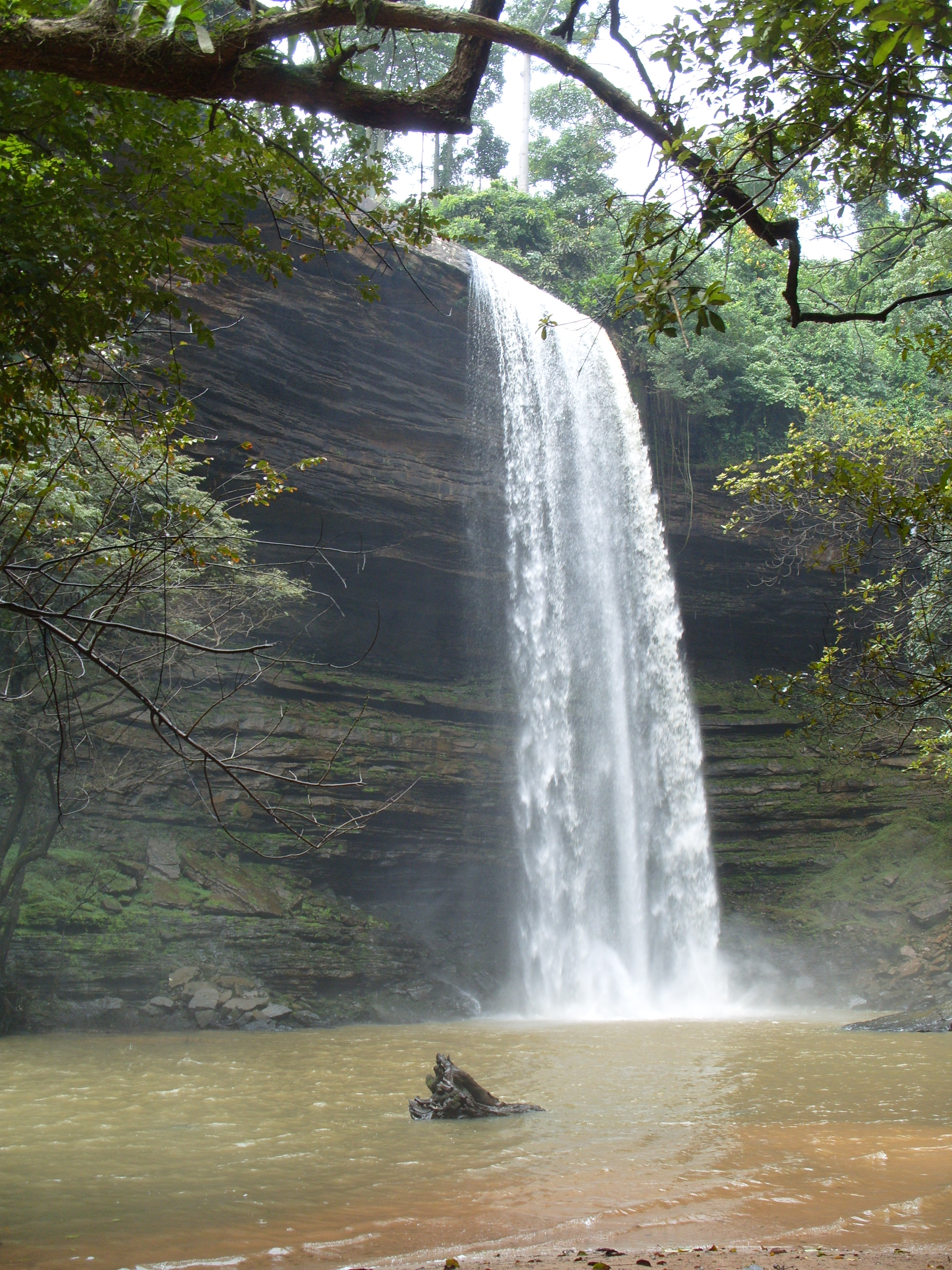
Boti Waterfalls.

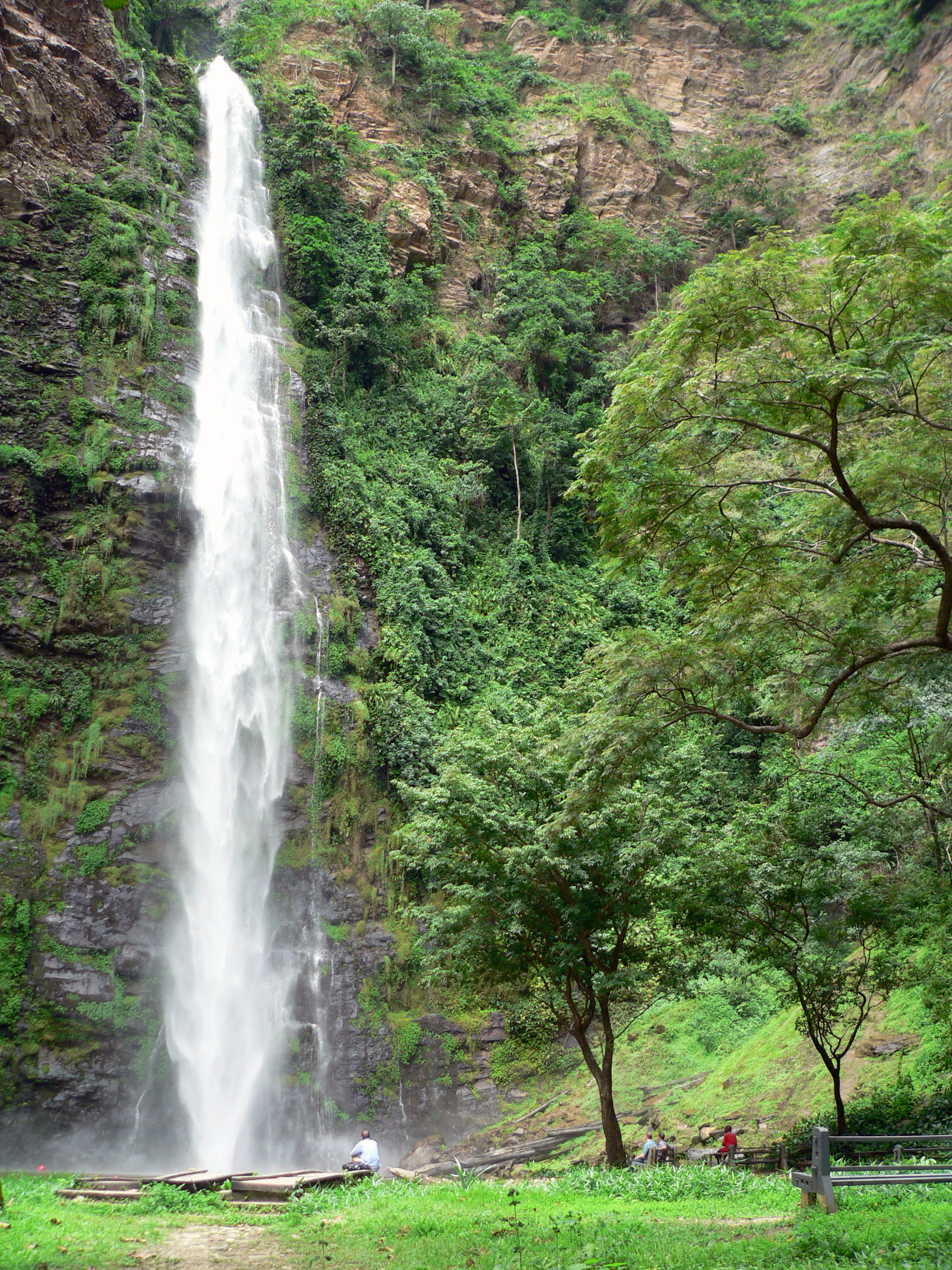
Wli Waterfalls.

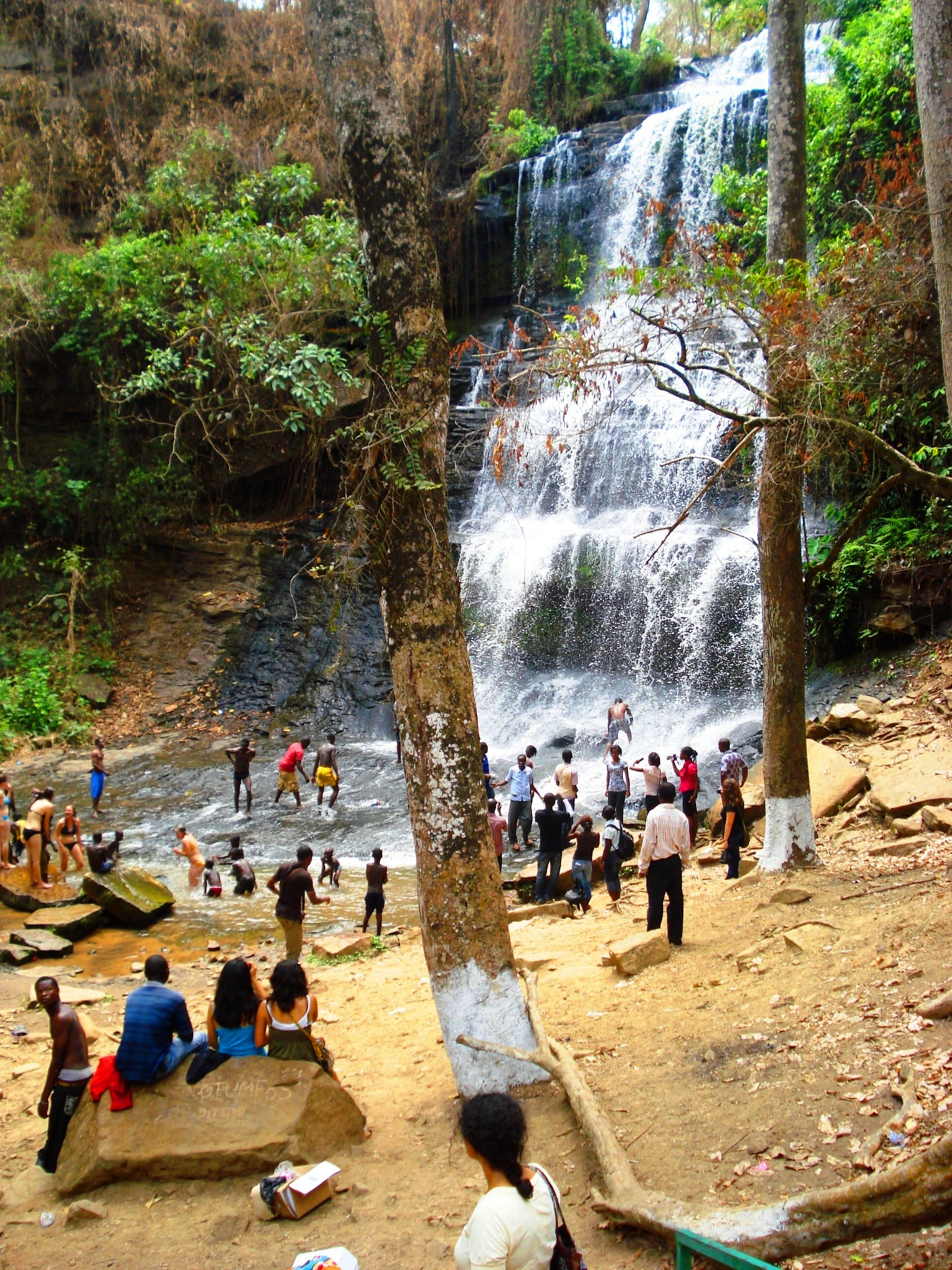
Kintampo waterfalls.

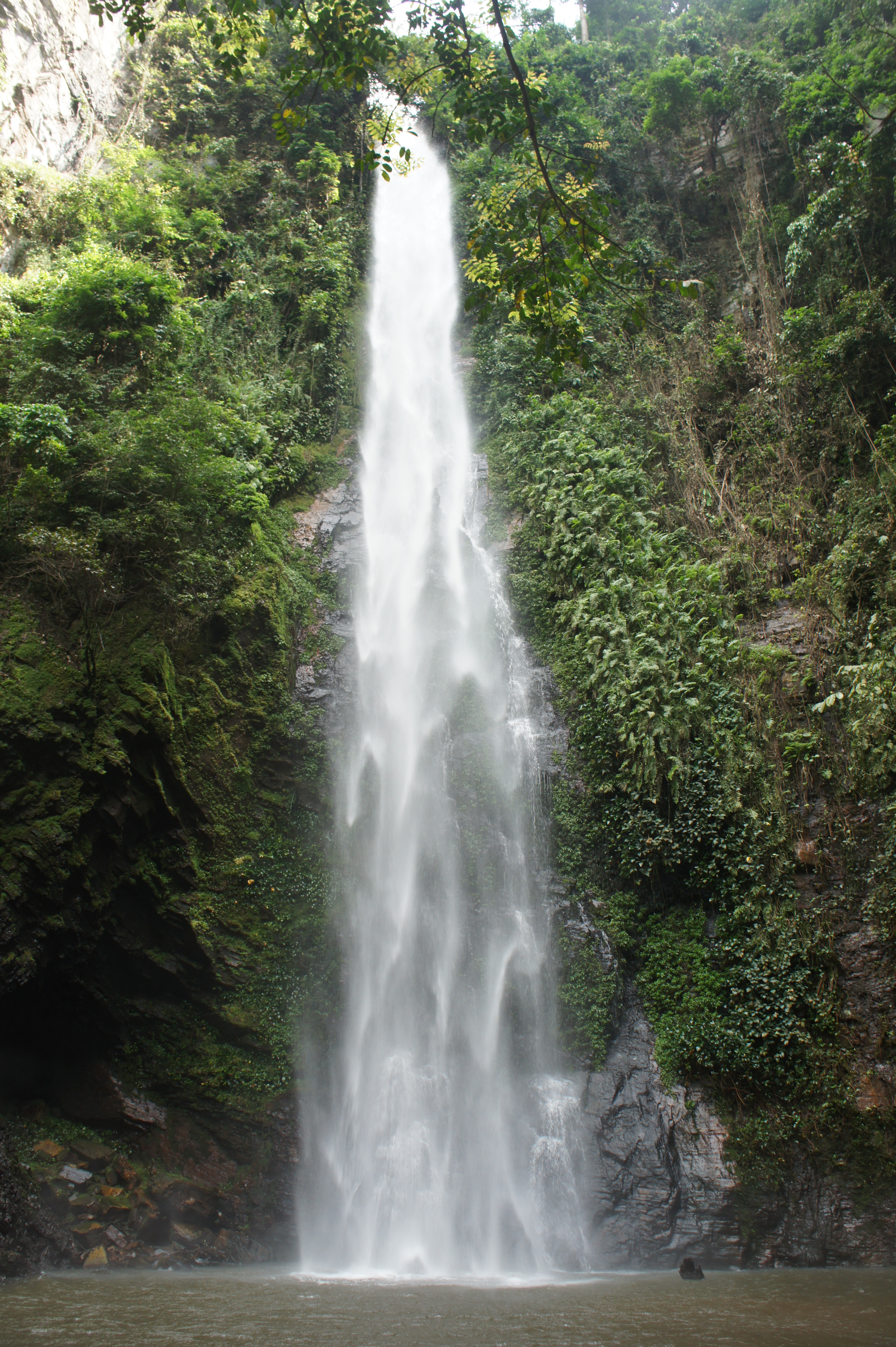
Tagbo Falls.

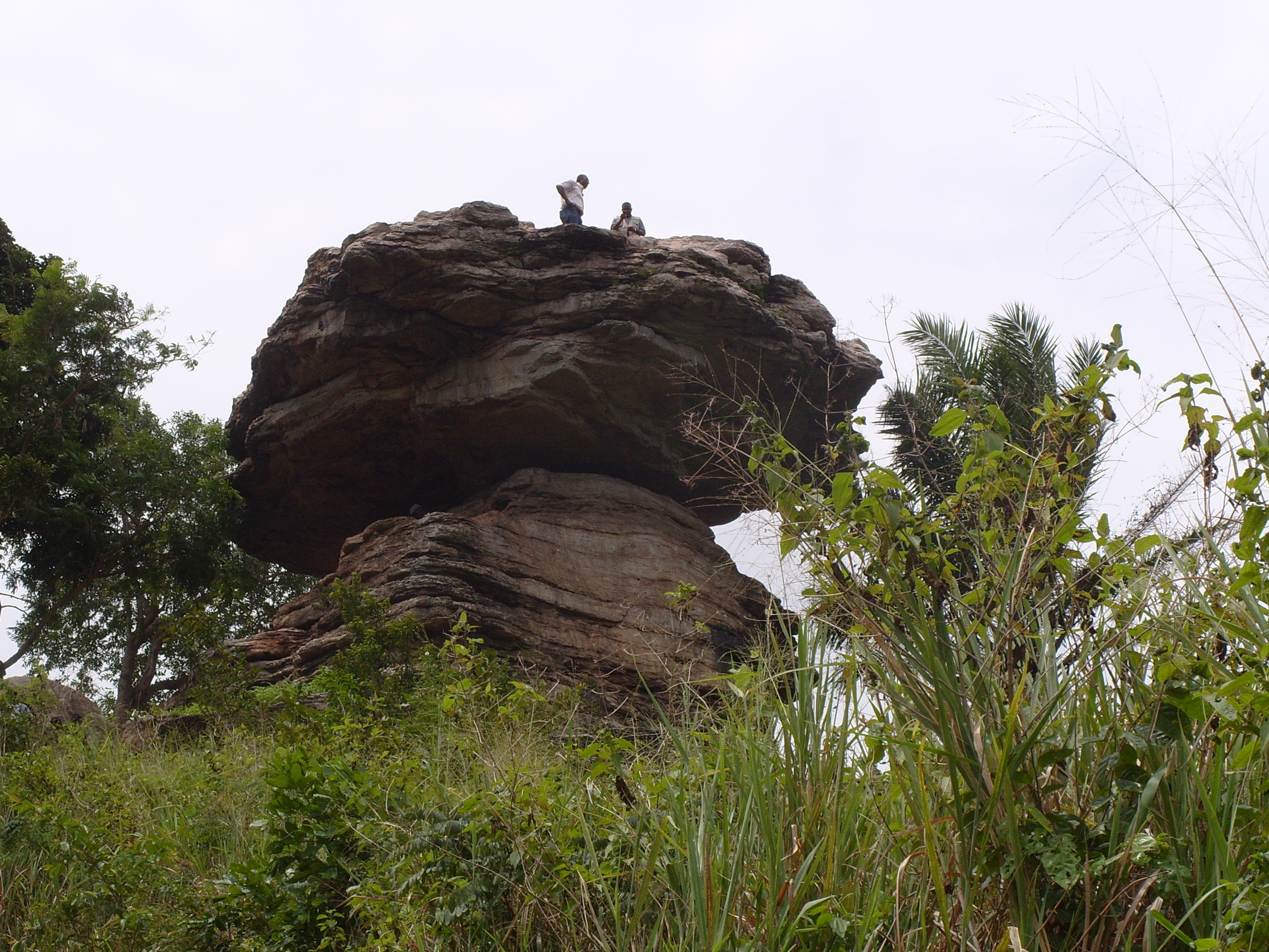
Umbrella Rock.

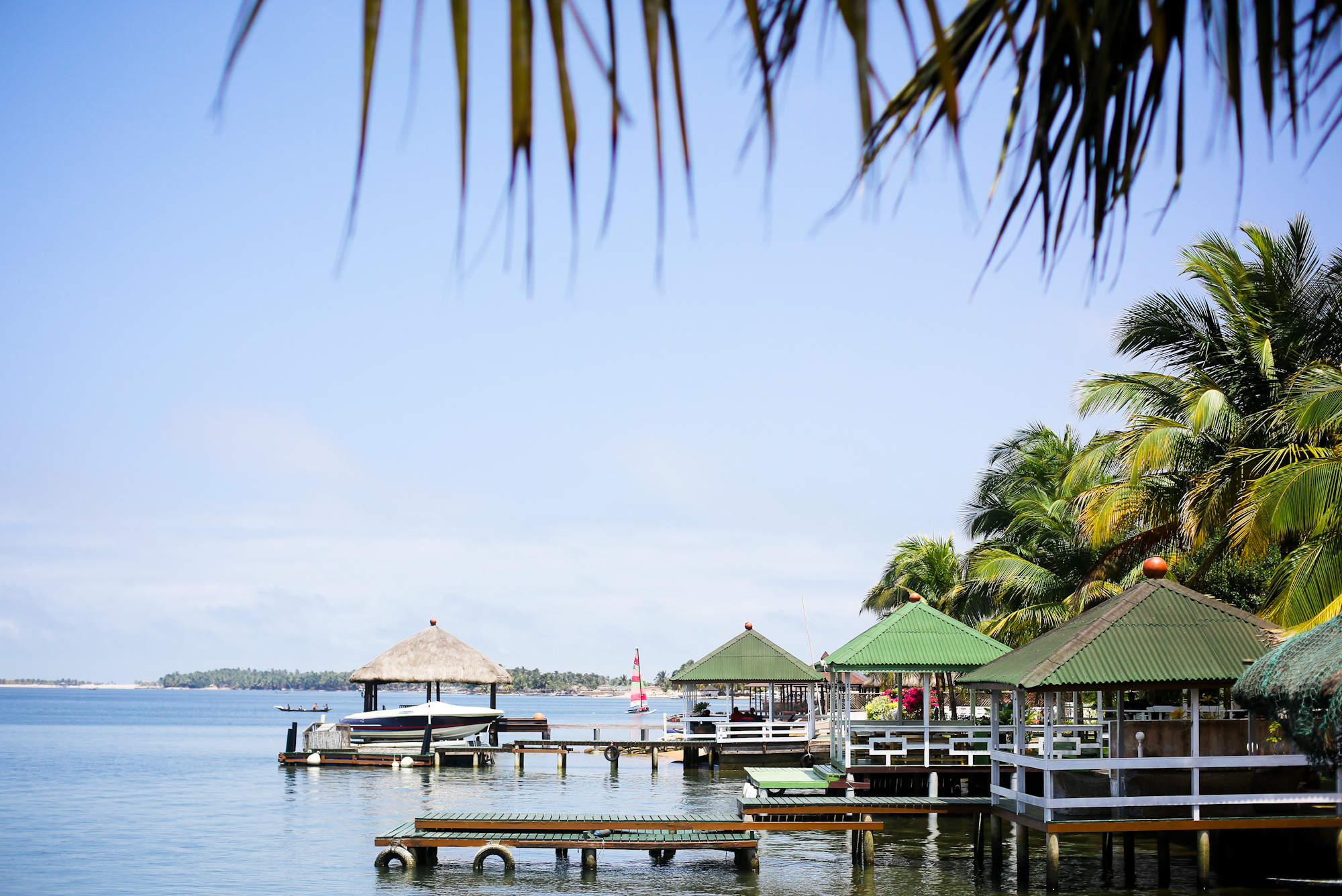
Tropical climatic Lagoons and Vacation Holiday resorts in Dodi Island on the Volta Lake.

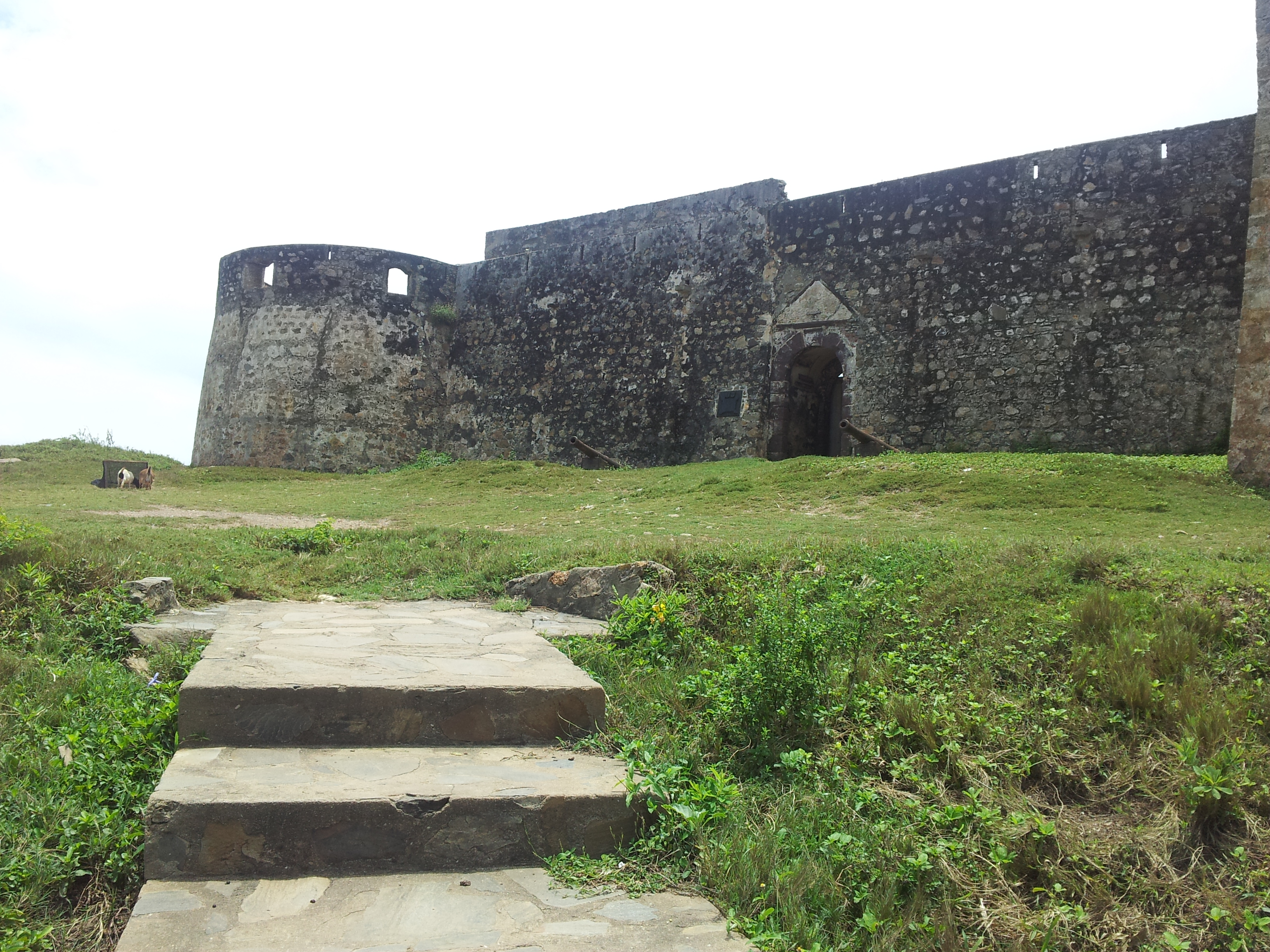
Fort Amsterdam.

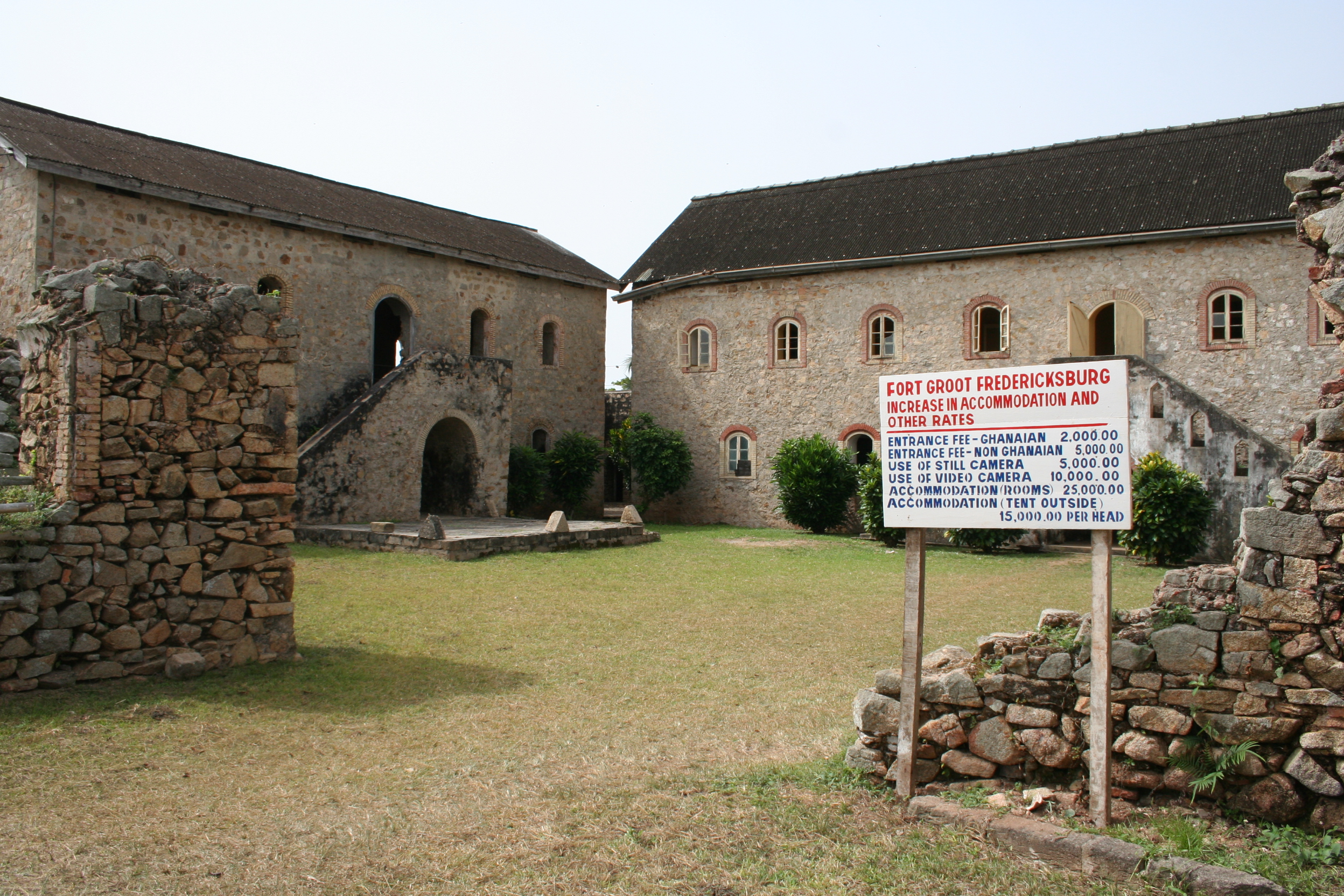
Fort Groot Fredericksburg.

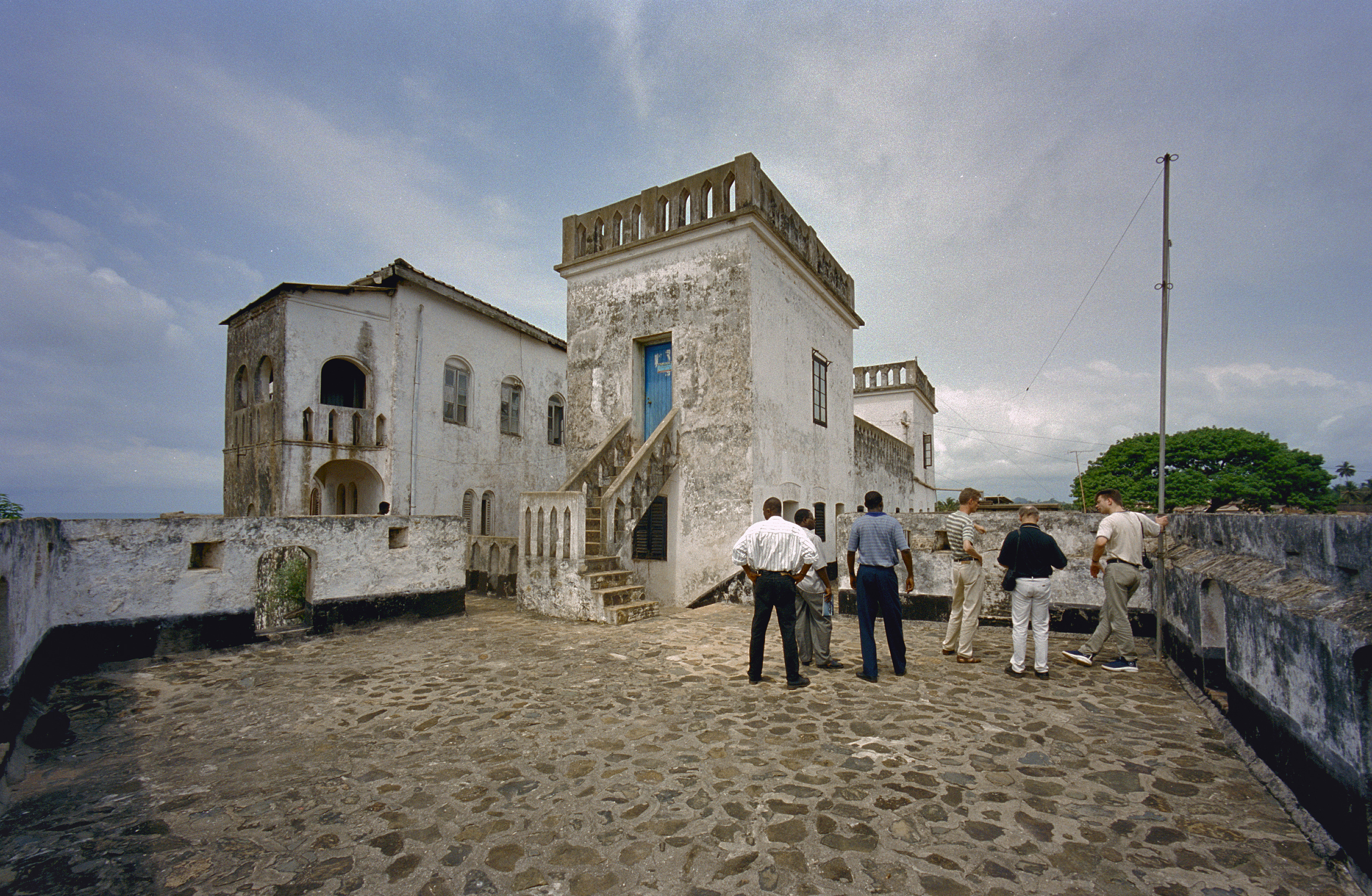
Fort Santo Antonio.

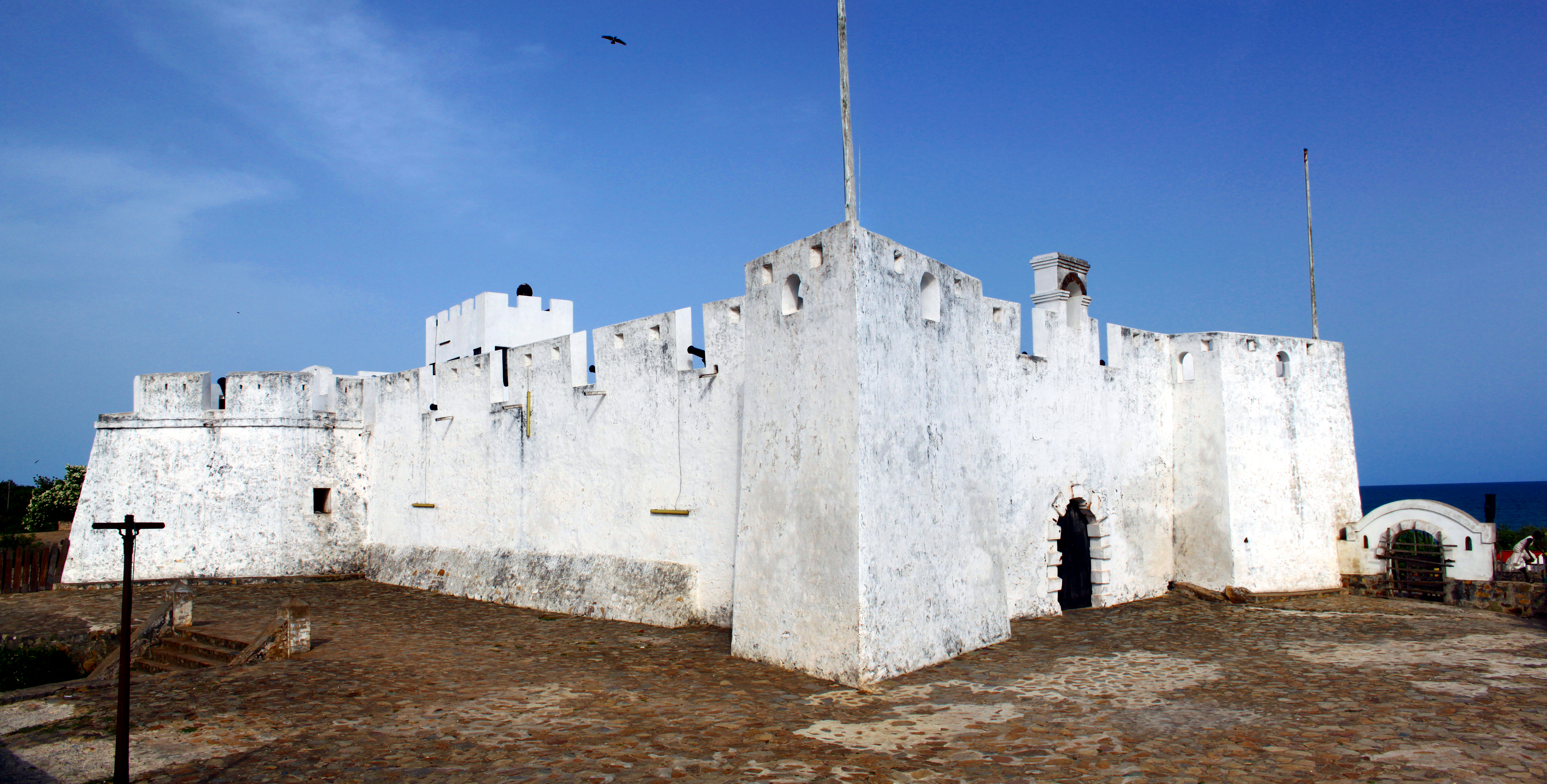
Fort Metal Cross.

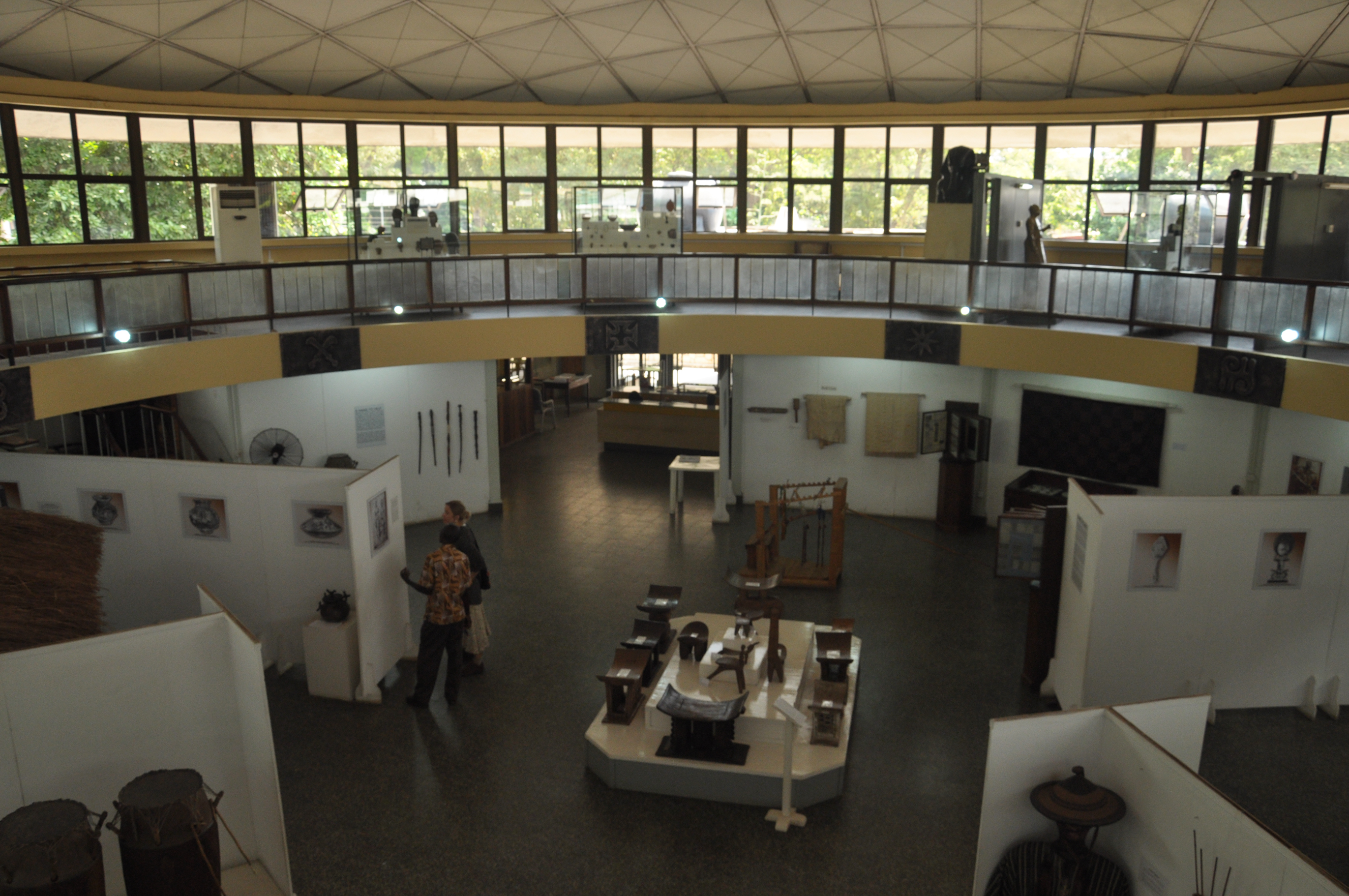
National Museum.

== See also ==
- Visa policy of Ghana
- Ghana's material cultural heritage
- Ministry of Tourism, Arts & Culture
- Transport in Ghana
