= Mount Afadja =

Mountain in Ghana

- Location within Ghana

Highest point
- Elevation: 587 m (1,926 ft)
- Prominence: 32 m (105 ft)
- Coordinates: 7°01′37″N 0°36′12″E

Geography
- Location: Hohoe Municipal District, Volta Region, Ghana
- Parent range: Agumatsa Range

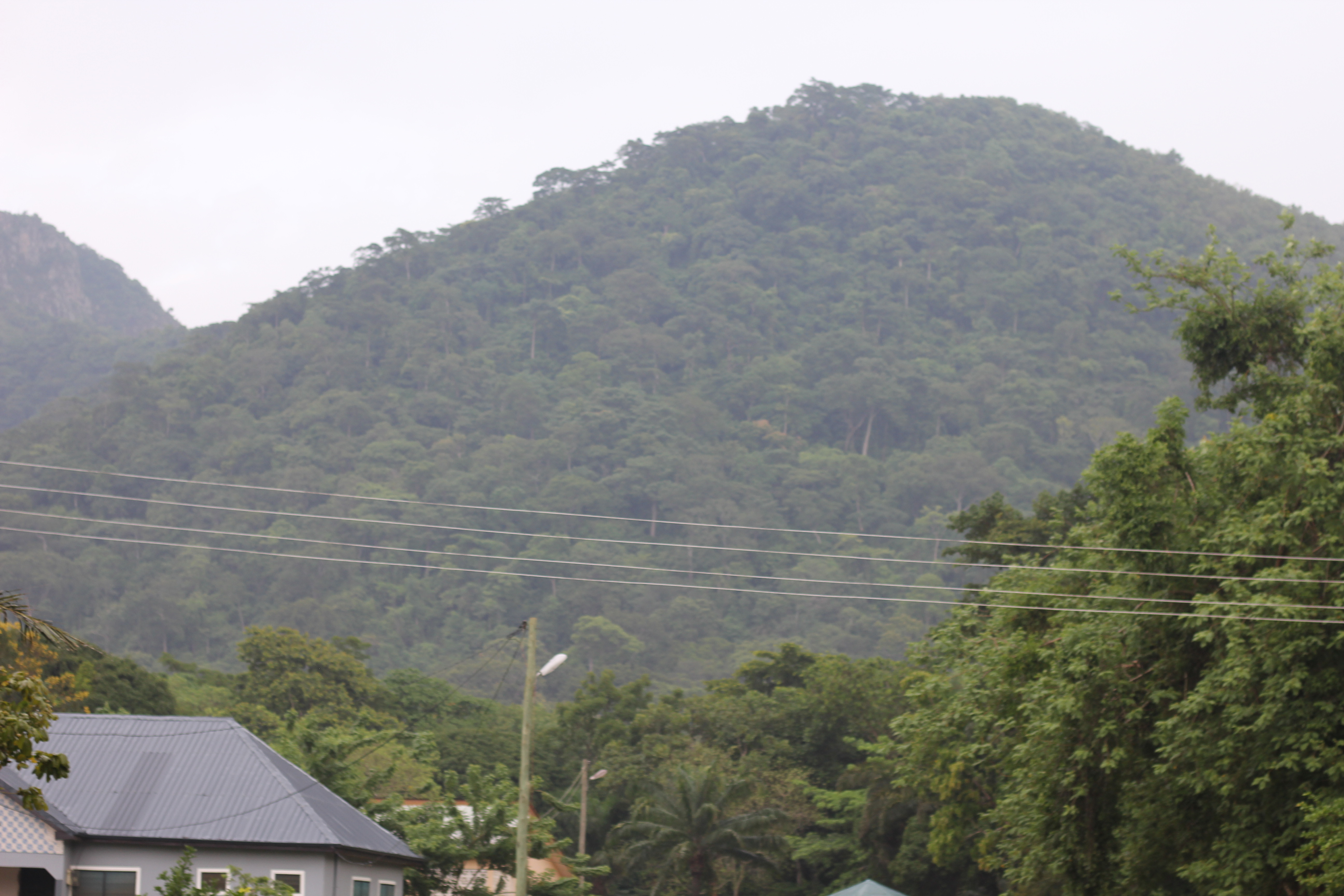
An image of Mount Afadja

Mount Afadja, known as Afadjato to the Ewe people of Ghana and Togo, is one of the highest mountains in Ghana. The summit is located in the Volta Region, near the border with Togo, close to the villages of Liati Wote and Gbledi Gbogame in the Afadjato South District and Hohoe Municipality, respectively. It is about 178 kilometers (111 mi) northeast of Accra, and 178 kilometers (111 mi) northwest of Lomé. Part of the Agumatsa sub-range of the West Africa Mountains, its summit is often cited at 885 metres (2,904 ft) above sea level, but in reality is only 587 metres (1,926 ft). The summit of Mount Aduadu (746 metres (2,448 ft)) lies 3.5 kilometers (2 mi) to the east, while Ghana's highest peak, Leklata, lies about 4.6 kilometers (2.9 miles) to the east.

== Name Origin and Meaning ==
The mountain's name is "Afadja," while the suffix "-to" in the Ewe language means mountain. The correct name in the English language, therefore, would be "Mount Afadja", not "Mount Afadjato", which would be a repetition of the word "mountain" and the correct name in the French language would be "Mont Afadja", not "Mont Afadjato".

According to legend, the Ewe people were beset by wild animal attacks when they first migrated to the area. In response, they fought back, overwhelming the animals and pursuing them as they retreated. This counterattack was stalled by an itching plant that prevented them from reaching the mountain to continue the battle.

In the Ewe language, “afar” means “war”, “dja” means “plant”, and “to” means “mountain”. Additionally, there were creeping plants on the mountain that resembled the water yam plant, so they called the mountain “Avadze-to.” Over time, the word became palatalised into “Afadjato.”

Mount Afadja is one of the most visited tourist attractions in the Volta Region of Ghana, welcoming thousands of visitors from around the globe annually. The nearby Tagbo Falls and Wli Falls (the highest in West Africa) are also popular tourist attractions. There are several caves, streams and other waterfalls in the area.

== History ==
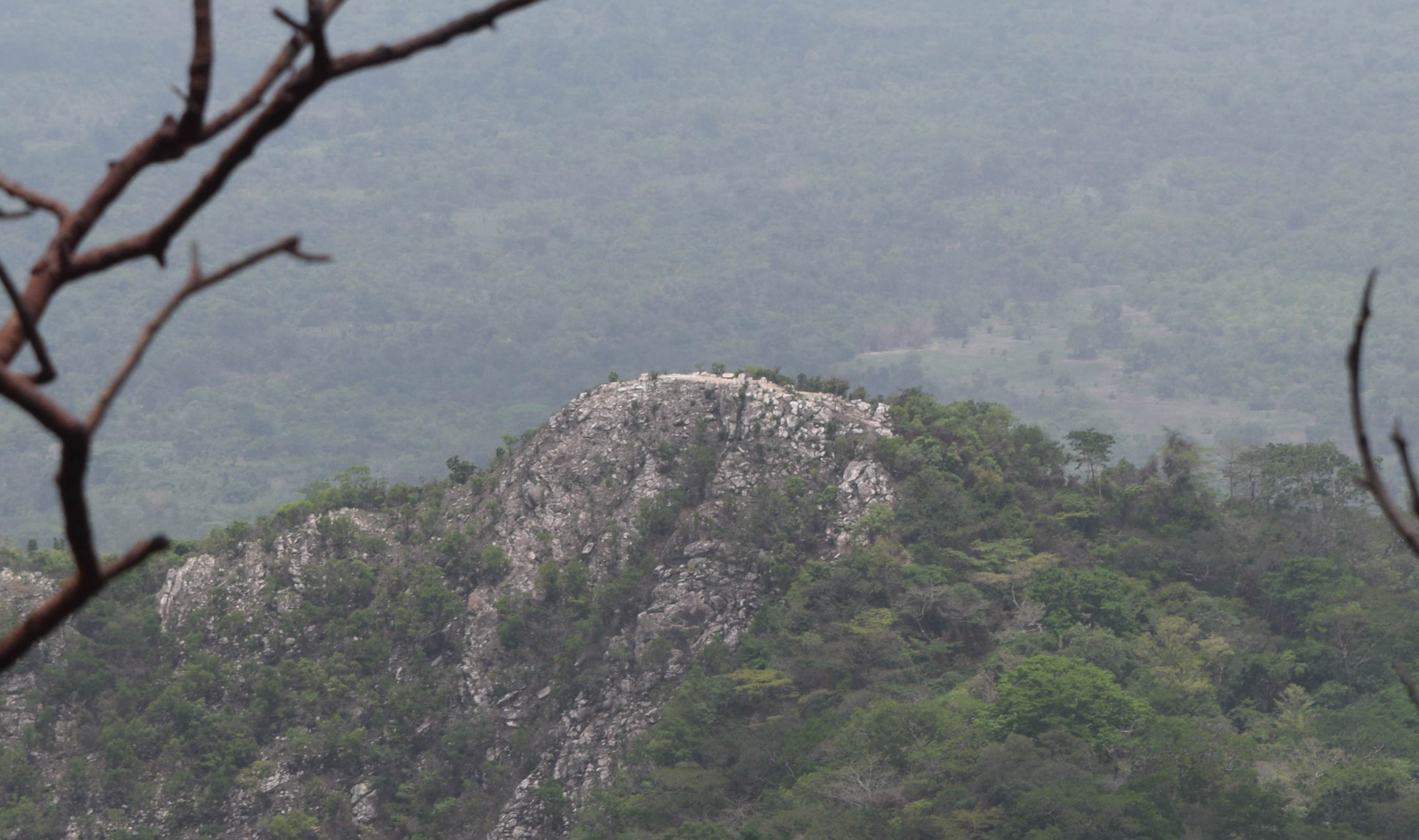
View from nearby Aduadu looking down to the peak of Afadja

Mount Afadja derives its name from the Ewe Word “Avadzeto” which means at war with the bush. 'Afadja' is the name of the mountain whereas 'to' in the Ewe language means mountain therefore it is called 'Afadjato' by the indigenes. The correct name would be 'Mount Afadja' as 'Mount Afadjato' will be a repetition of the 'Mountain.' The mountain is located in the Agumatsa Range near the villages of Gbledi and Liati Wote. The lush green mountains of the ridge mark the country's border with Togo.

== Tourist attractions ==
The nearby Tagbo Falls and Wli Agumatsa Waterfalls (the highest in West Africa) are also considered tourist attractions. There are several caves, streams and other waterfalls in the area. There is a plant species on the mountainsides that causes severe irritation. Shielded by the tropical forests of Ghana, the mountain provides a home to many species of flora and fauna. More than 33 species of mammals and about 300 butterfly species live in the ecological region. Also, regularly spotted in the mountains is the Mona and spotted monkeys. People often come to climb the mountain or observe the surrounding beauty.

== Location ==
The mountain is located in the Volta region, close to the Ghana-Togo border and Volta Lake on the east of Ghana.

== In popular culture ==
In March 2023, Joy FM’s flagship entertainment talk show Showbiz A-Z broadcast a special live edition from the foot of Mount Afadja as part of its Ghana Month celebrations. The episode, which aired on March 11, explored the tourism potential of the Volta Region and discussed the cultural and economic impact of Afadjato on the area. The programme featured many guests, including traditional leaders such as Togbega Hometepkor V and Togbe Adabra IV, as well as representatives from the Ghana Tourism Authority. The event also included cultural activities such as drumming, dancing, a food bazaar, and a mini durbar showcasing Volta Region’s diverse cuisine and heritage.
