= Mount Aduadu =

Mountain in Ghana

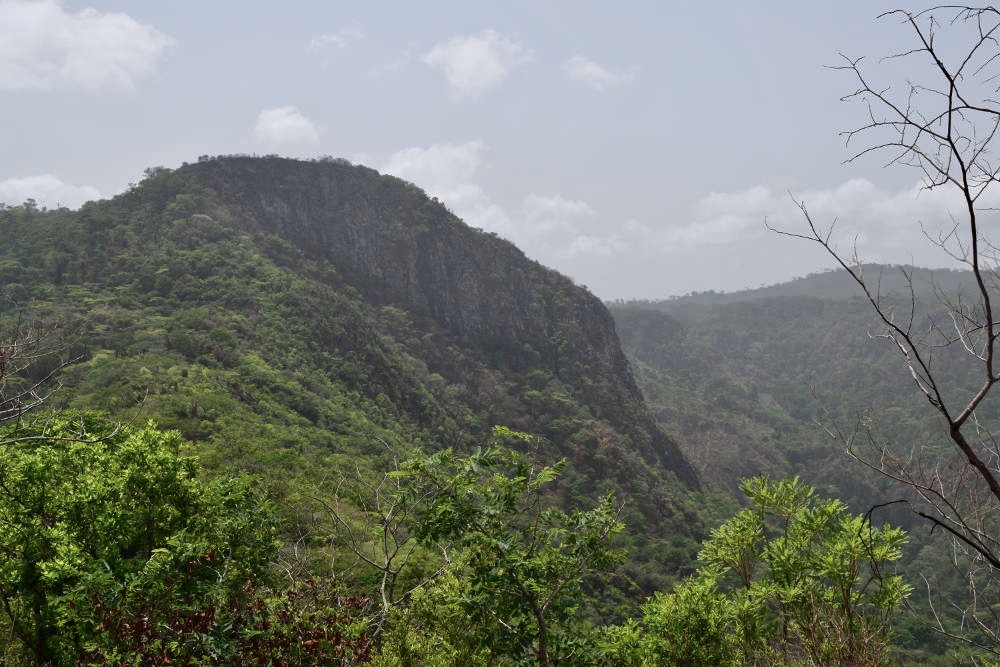
- Mount Aduadu as seen from Mount Afadja

Highest point
- Elevation: 746 m (2,448 ft)
- Coordinates: 7°01′08″N 0°34′16″E

Geography
- Location within Ghana
- Location: Hohoe Municipal District, Volta Region, Ghana
- Parent range: Agumatsa Range

Mount Aduadu is a mountain in Ghana, standing at an elevation of c. 746 metres (2,448 ft). The mountain is located in the Agumatsa Range near the villages of Gblede, Liati Wote and Wli, in the Volta Region of Ghana at the border with Togo.

The highest mountain in Ghana is Leklata at 900 metres (2,953 ft).

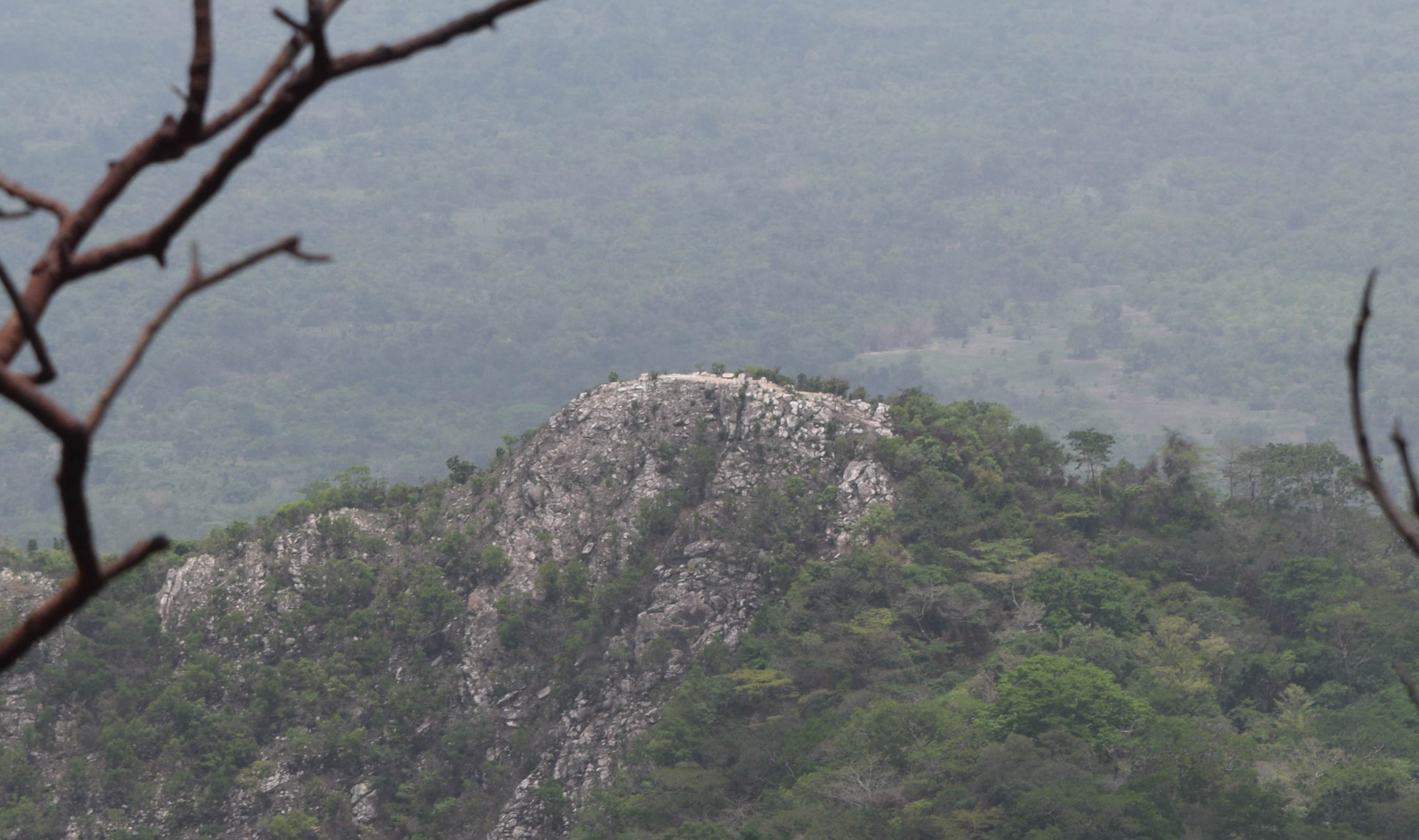
View from Aduadu showing the peak of Afadja below
