= Agumatsa Range =

Mountain range in Ghana

Coordinates: 7°6′22″N 0°36′32″E

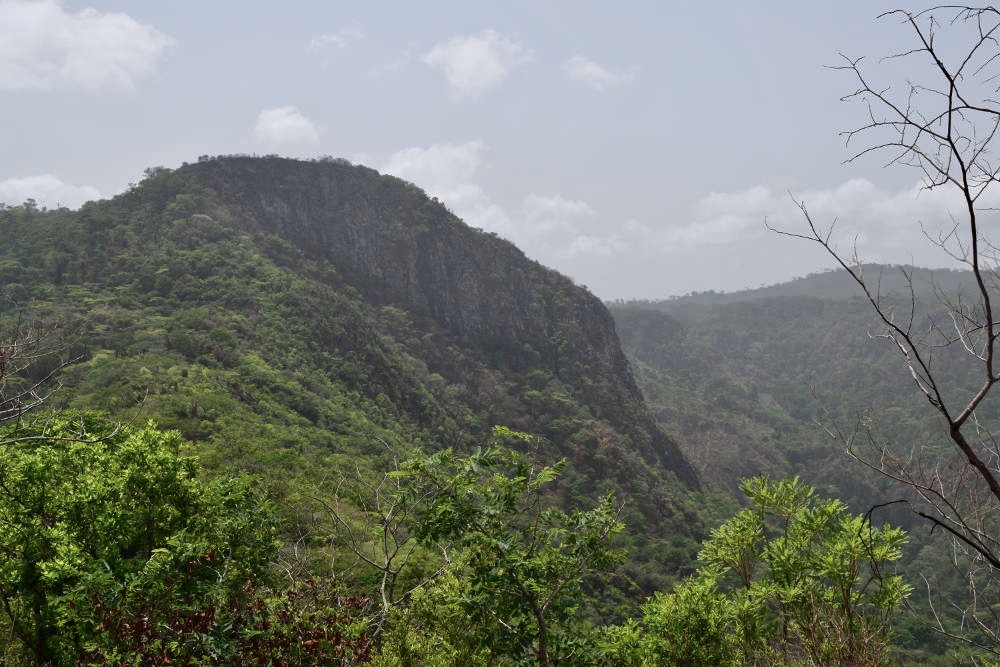
Mount Aduadu

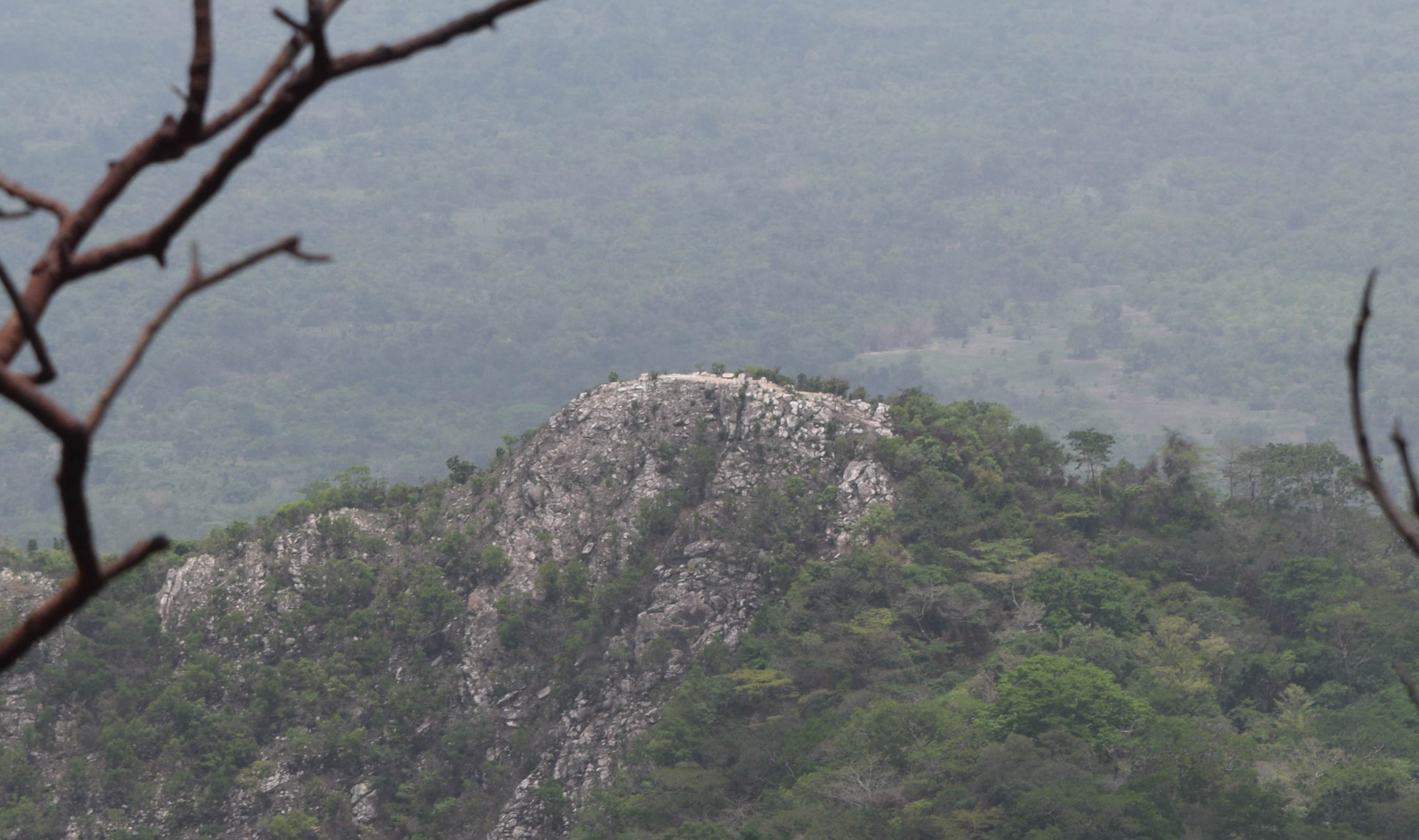
Mount Afadja

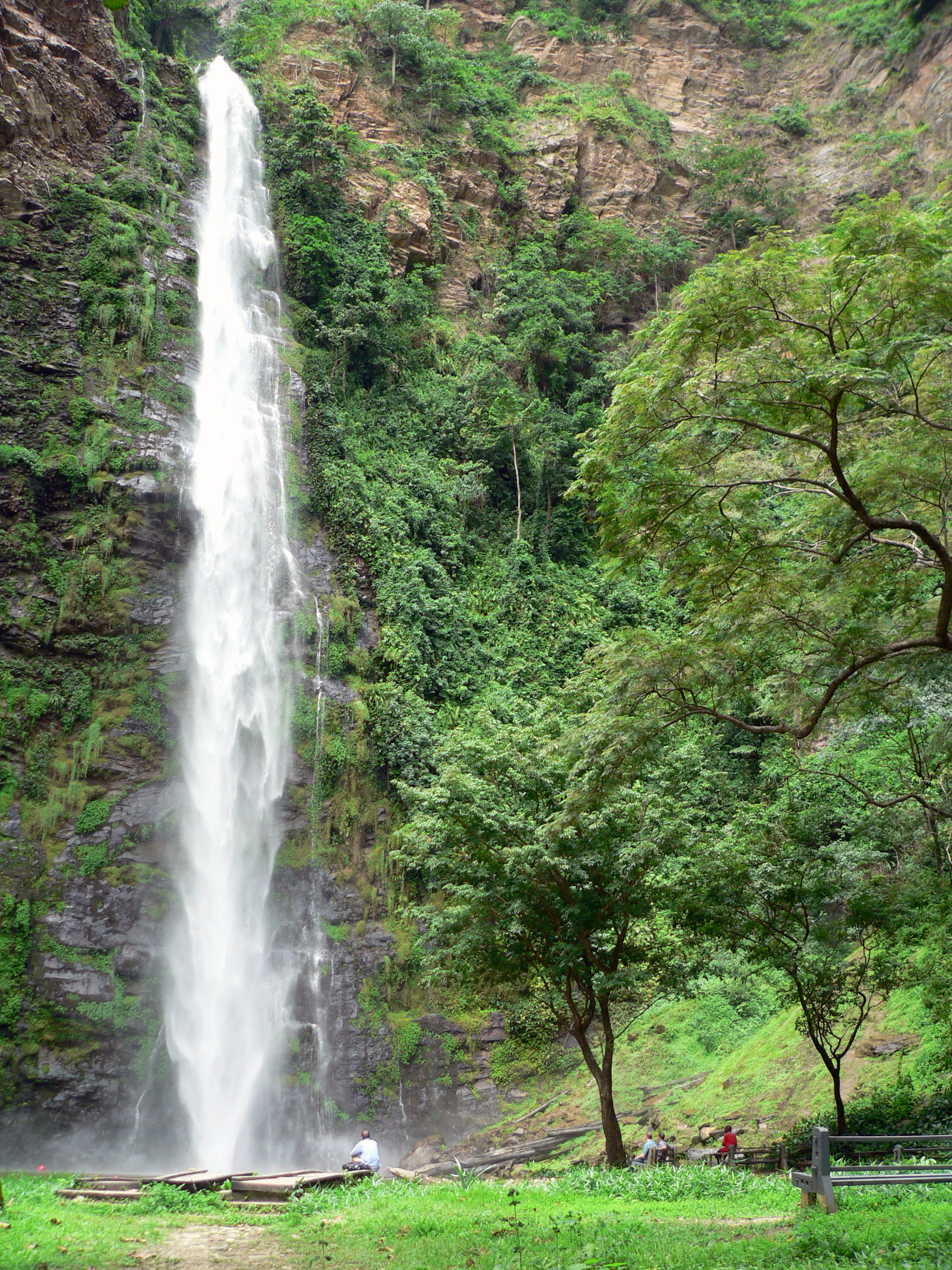
Wli waterfalls

Agumatsa is a mountain range in Ghana which includes the country's highest points: Mount Aduadu and the nearby Mount Afadja. The popular tourist attraction, Wli waterfalls is within the range. The range also contains a conservation area, the Mount Afadja-Agumatsa Range.
