= Tagbo Falls =

Coordinates: 7°0′47″N 0°34′16″E

Tagbo
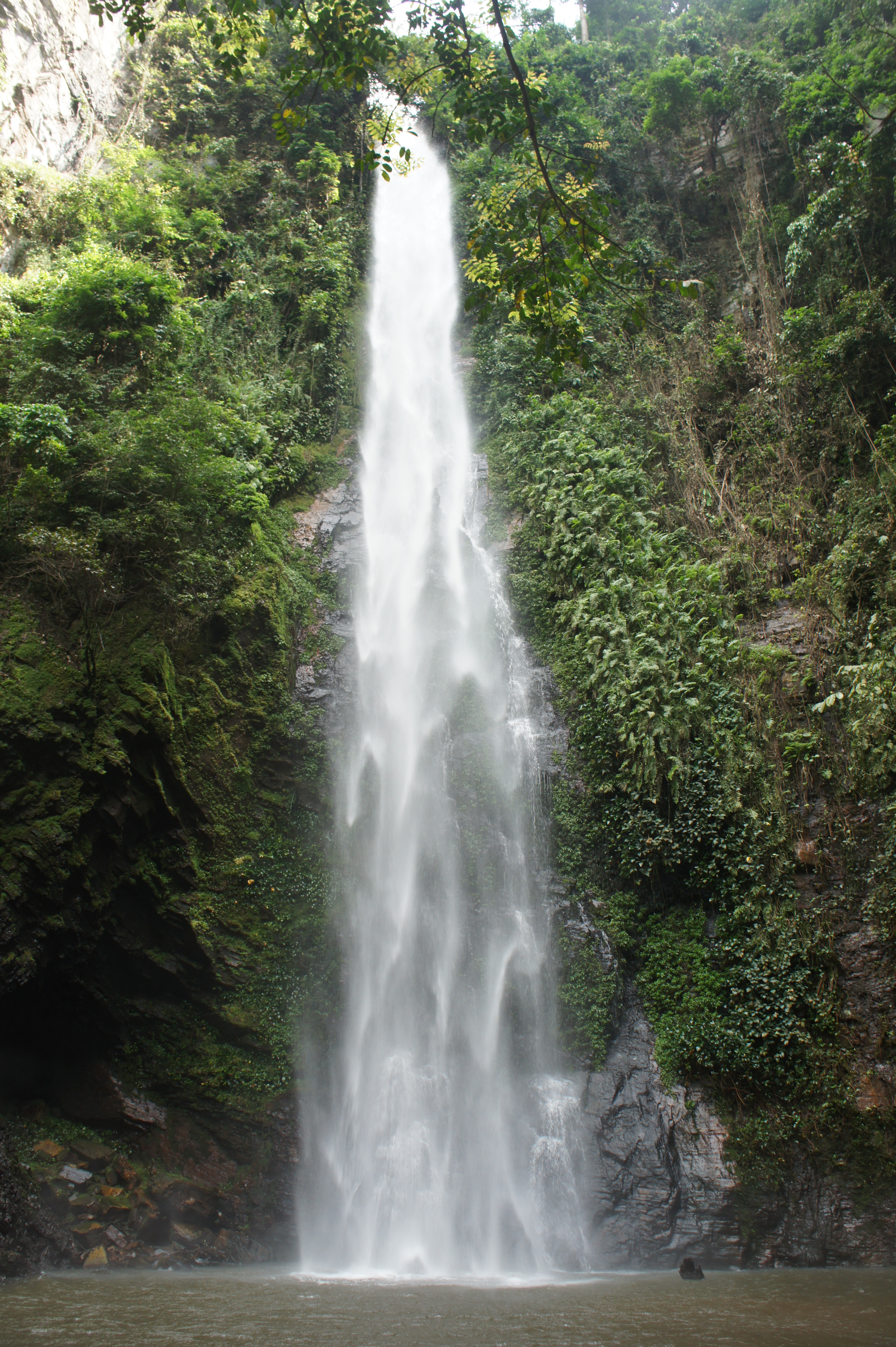
- Tagbo Falls at Liati Wote
- Interactive map of Tagbo
- Location: Liati Wote , Volta Region, Ghana
- Type: Chute

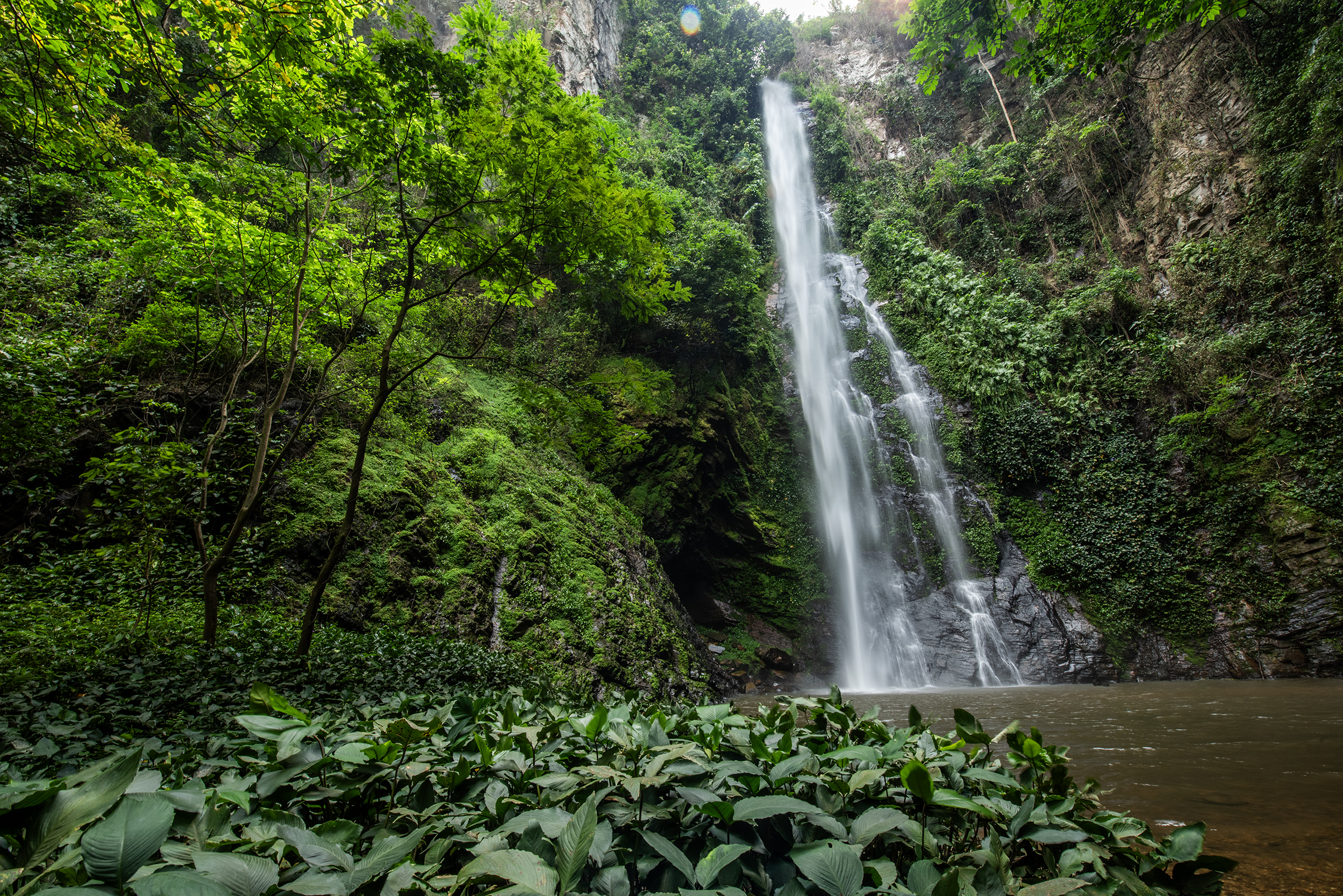
A picture of Tagbo Falls

Tagbo Falls is a waterfall near Mount Afadjato in Ghana, located at Liati Wote, approximately 27 kilometres east of the township of Hohoe. The water falls down in several stages, with the last stage being about 60 m. high. The area is surrounded by rainforest.

== See also ==
- List of waterfalls
