= Entemena =

En-teme-na 𒂗𒋼𒈨𒈾
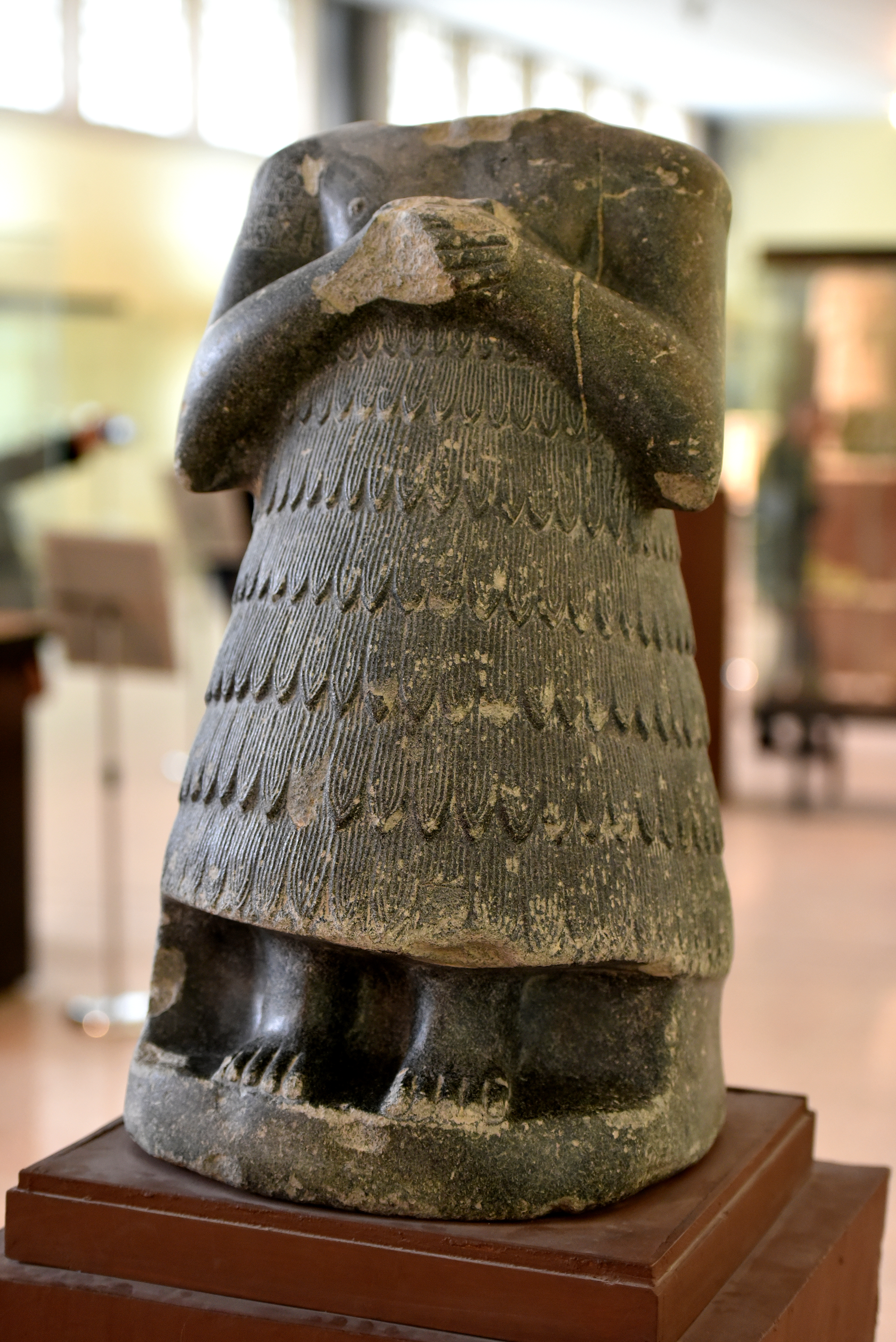
- Statue of Entemena, Iraq Museum. The statue has a long inscription on the back dedicated to Enlil.

King of Lagash
- Reign: c. 2400 BC
- Predecessor: Enannatum I
- Successor: Enannatum II
- Issue: Enannatum II
- Dynasty: 1st Dynasty of Lagash
- Father: Enannatum I

Location of Lagash

Entemena, also called Enmetena (Sumerian: 𒂗𒋼𒈨𒈾, EN-TE-ME-NA; fl. c. 2400 BC), was a son of Enannatum I who re-established Lagash as a power in Sumer. He defeated Il in a territorial conflict through an alliance with Lugal-kinishe-dudu of Uruk, successor to Enshakushanna, who is in the king list. The tutelary deity Shul-utula was his personal deity. His reign lasted at least 19 years.

== Territory ==
Entemena of Lagash controlled the cities of southern Mesopotamia, from Badtibira to Uruk:

"At that time, Entemena built and reconstructed the E-mush, his beloved temple, in Badtibira, for the god Lugalemush, (and) he set free the citizens of Uruk, Larsa, and Badtibira."

— Inscriptions of Entemena.

== Alliance treaty ==
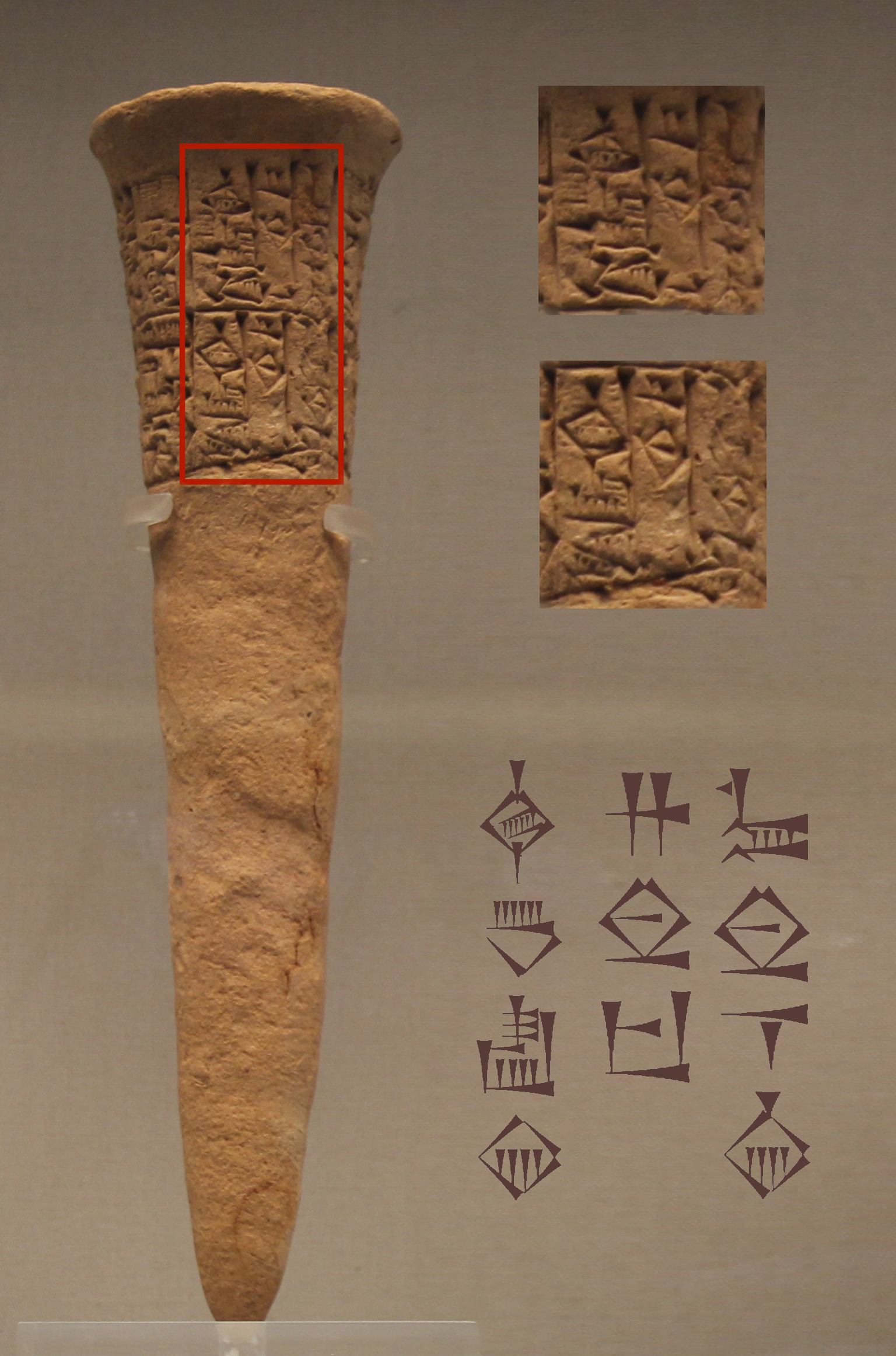
"Entemena Ensi Lagash-ki" (𒂗𒋼𒈨𒈾𒑐𒋼𒋛𒉢𒁓𒆷𒆠) on the Treaty Cone of Entemena, king of Lagash, to god of Bad-Tibira, about the peace treaty between Lagash and Uruk. This text is the oldest known diplomatic document. Dated c. 2400 BC. British Museum.

A clay nail found in Girsu commemorates the alliance which he concluded with Lugal-kinishe-dudu of Uruk, the oldest mention of a peace treaty between two kings that we know:

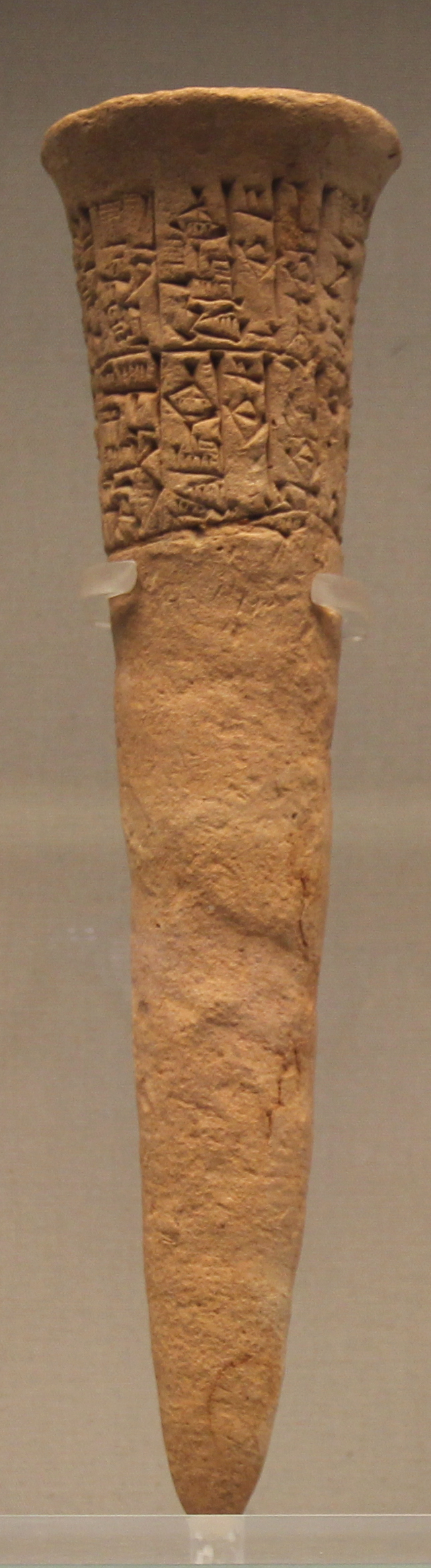
Cone of Entemena mentioning the alliance with Lugal-kinishe-dudu

1st line:
^{D}inanna-ra / ^{D}lugal-e2-muš3-ra / en-mete-na / ensi2 / lagaški-ke4 / e2-muš3 e2 ki-ag2-ga2-ne-ne / mu-ne-du3 / KIBgunû mu-na-du11 / en-mete-na / lu2 e2-muš3 du3-a
2nd line:
^{D}-ra-ni / dšul-utul12-am6 / u4-ba en-mete-na / ensi2 / lagaški / lugal-ki-ne2-eš2-du7-du7 / ensi2 / unuki-bi / nam-šeš e-ak

1st line:
"For Inanna / and Lugal-emuš / Enmetena / ruler / of Lagaš, / the E-muš, their beloved temple, / built / and ordered (these) clay nails for them. / Enmetena, / who built the E-muš,"
2nd line:
"his personal god / is Šul-utul. / At that time, Enmetena, / ruler / of Lagaš, / and Lugal-kineš-dudu, / ruler / of Uruk, / established brotherhood."

— Alliance treaty between Entemena and Lugal-kinishe-dudu.

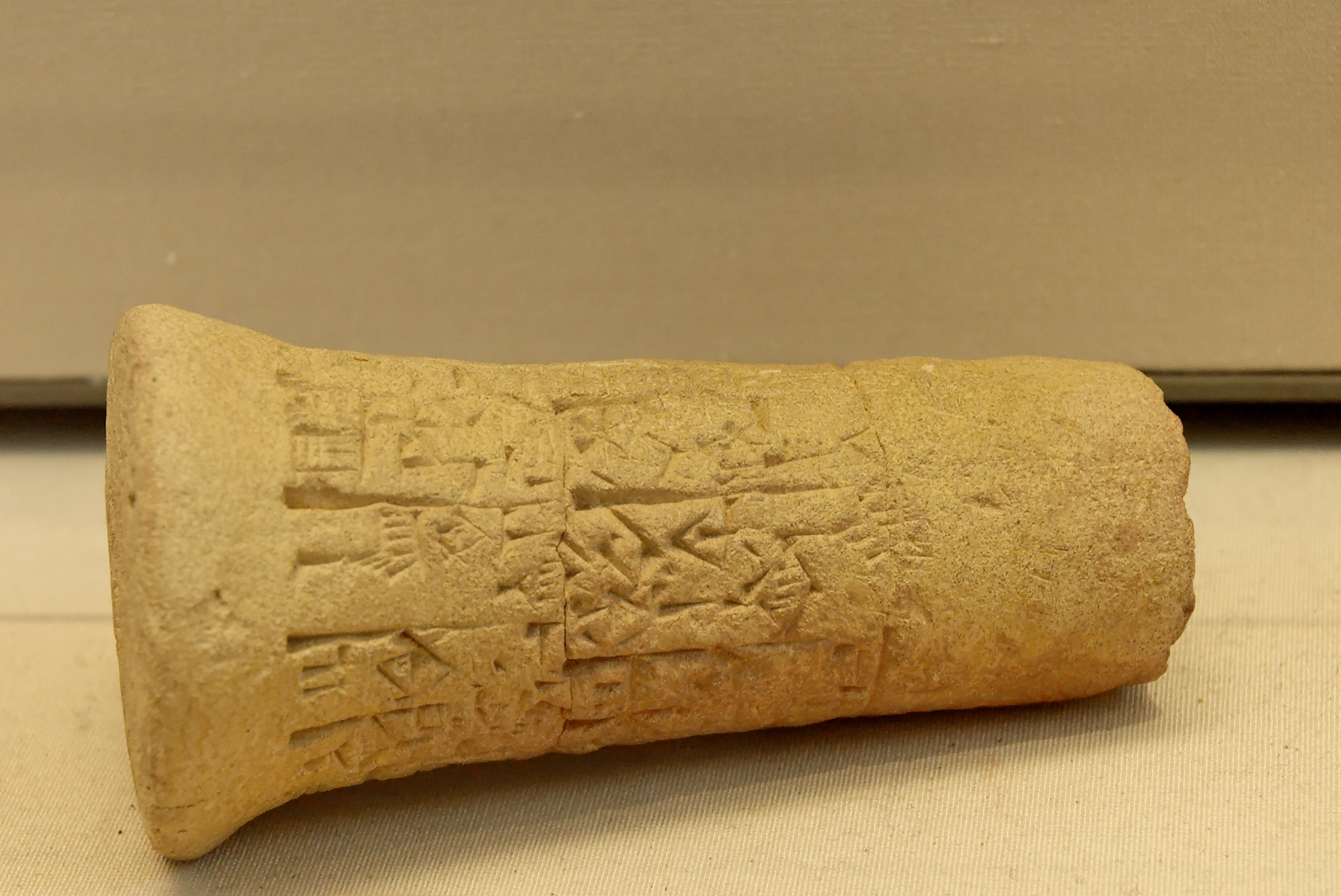
Another example of the foundation nail dedicated by Entemena, king of Lagash, to god of Bad-Tibira, about the peace treaty between Lagash and Uruk. Louvre Museum.

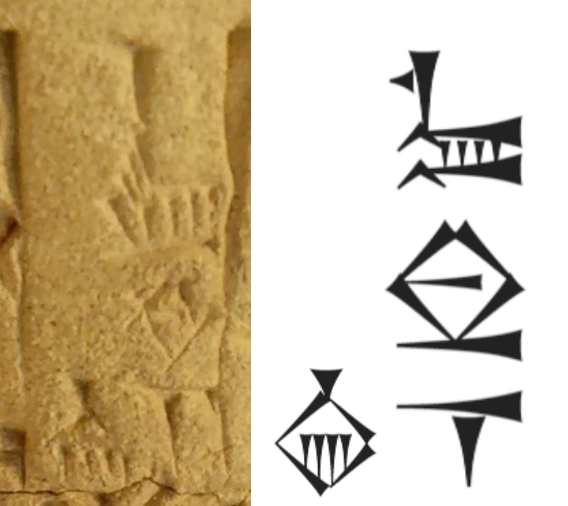
Cuneiforms for "Entemena" on the Harvard cone

== Territorial conflict with King Il of Umma ==
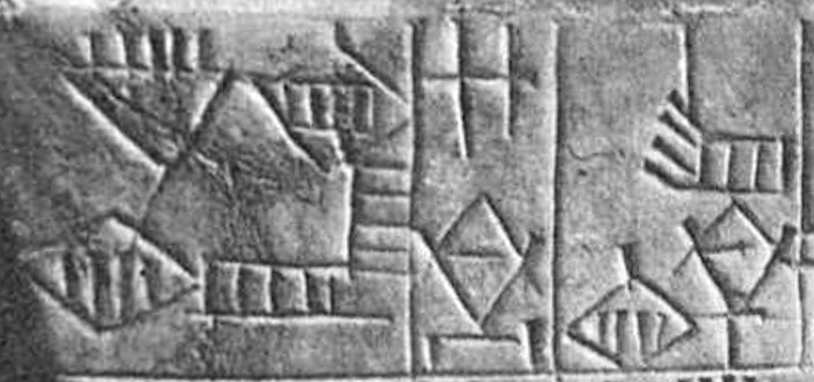
"Entemena, Governor of Lagash" 𒂗𒋼𒈨𒈾𒑐𒋼𒋛𒉢𒁓𒆷𒆠 Entemena ensi Lagash-ki

Entemena entered in a territorial conflict with Il, king of Umma, as mentioned in the "war inscription" on his cone in the Louvre Museum:

"He (Il, Governor of Umma) diverted water from the boundary-channel of Ningirsu and the boundary-channel of Nanshe (...). When because of those channels, Enmetena, the governor of Lagash, sent envoys to Il, Il, the governor of Umma, who steals fields (and) speaks evil, declared: 'The boundary-channel of Ningirsu (and) the boundary-channel of Nanshe are mine! I will shift the boundary-levee from Antasura to Edimgalabzu!' But Enlil (and) Ninhursang did not give it to him."

Il was defeated by Entemena, who had sought the aid of Lugal-kinishe-dudu of Uruk, successor to Enshakushanna, who is in the king list.

== War inscription by Entemena of Lagaš ==
=== Foundation cone of Entemena ===
A foundation cone of Entemena, in excellent condition relates the beginning of a war between the city-states of Lagaš and Umma during the Early Dynastic III period, one of the earliest border conflicts recorded. (RIME 1.09.05.01). This text was inscribed on a small clay cone c. 2400 BC (Louvre Museum, reference AO 3004). The first row of cuneiform characters reads:

Cone of Entemena

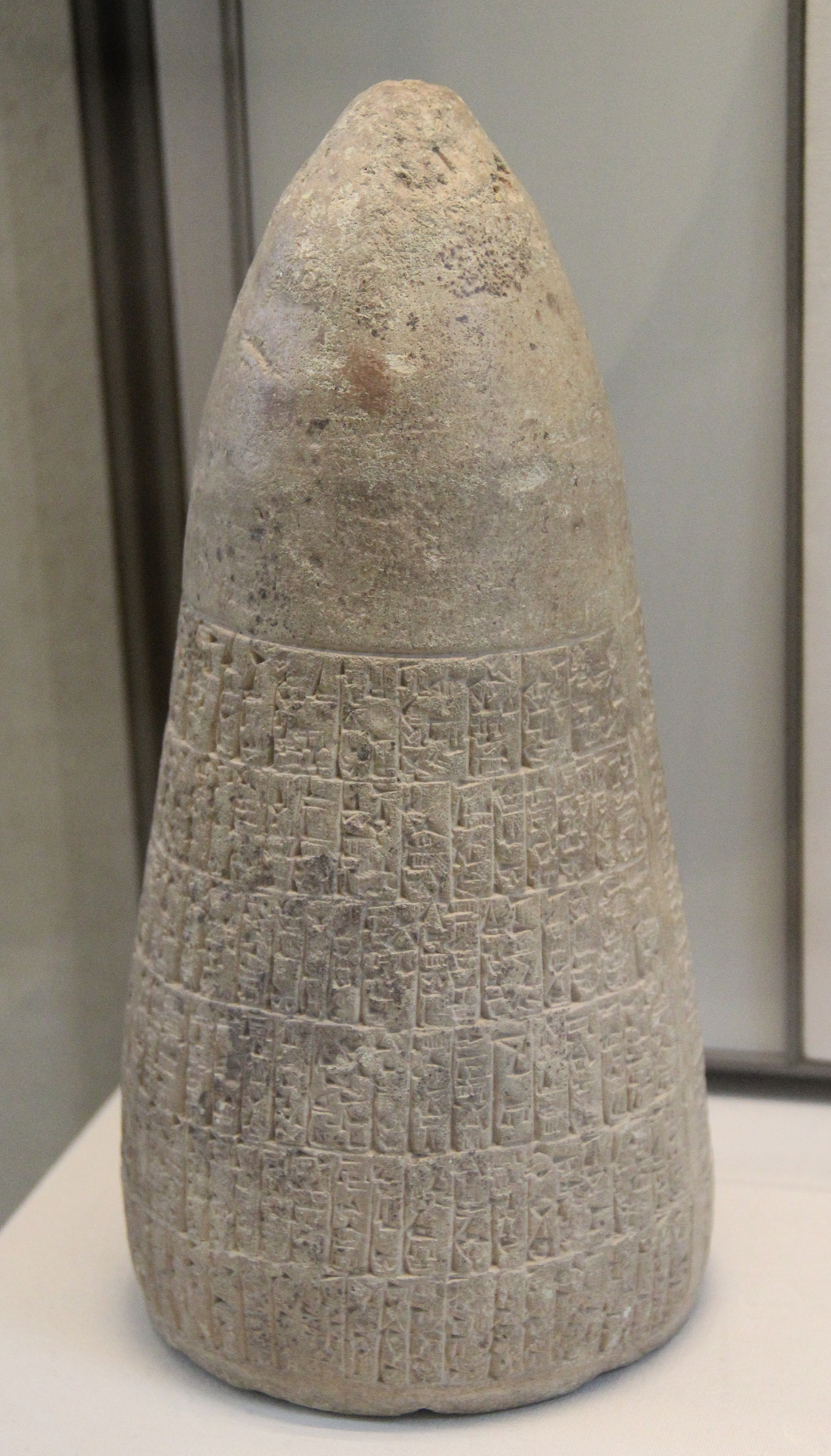
Cone of Enmetena, king of Lagash, Room 236 Reference AO 3004, Louvre Museum (upside down).

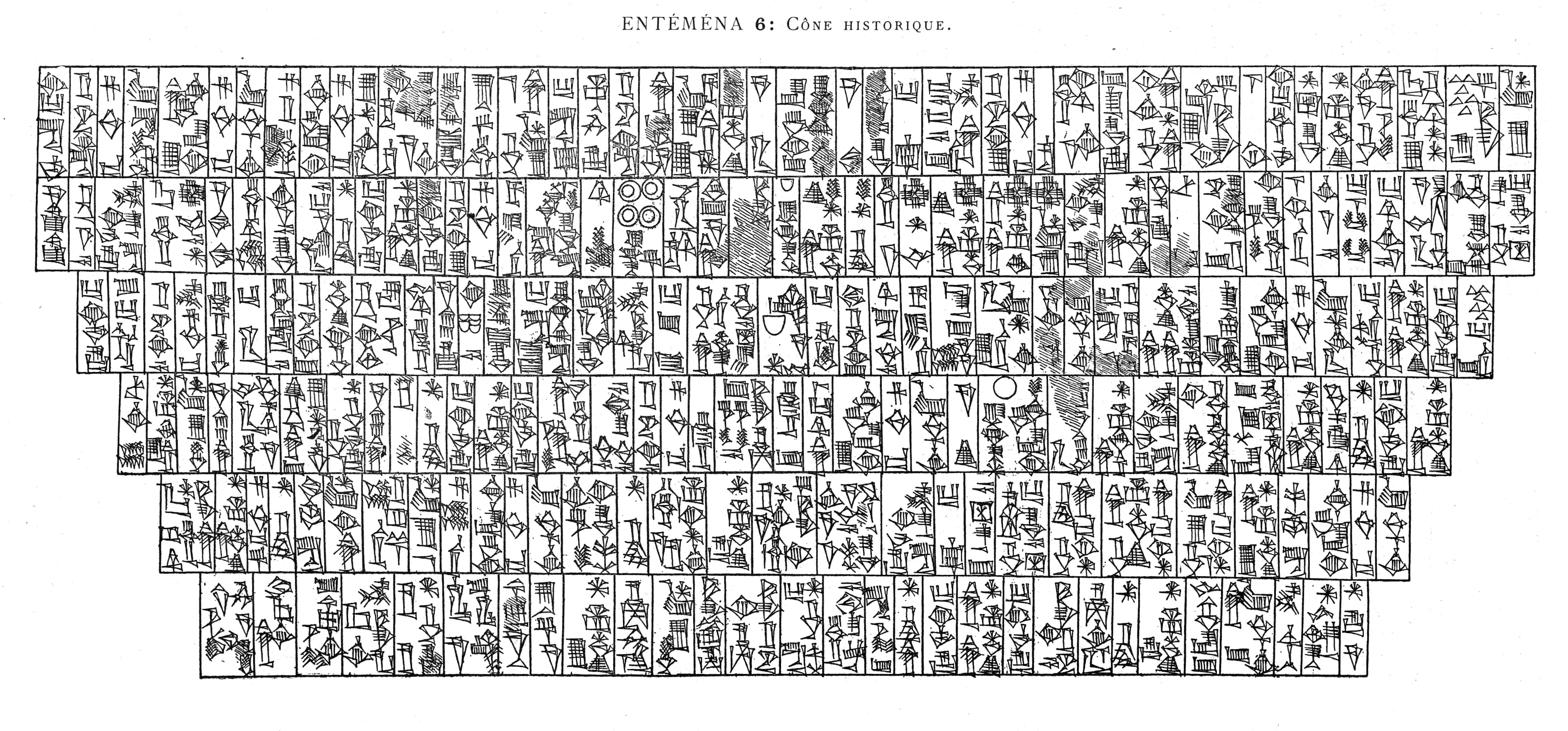
Transcription of the cone of Entemena.

I.1–7	𒀭𒂗𒆤 𒈗 𒆳𒆳𒊏 𒀊𒁀 𒀭𒀭𒌷𒉈𒆤 𒅗 𒄀𒈾𒉌𒋫 𒀭𒊩𒌆𒄈𒋢 𒀭𒇋𒁉 𒆠 𒂊𒉈𒋩
	^{d}en-lil_{2} lugal kur-kur-ra ab-ba dig̃ir-dig̃ir-re_{2}-ne-ke_{4} inim gi-na-ni-ta ^{d}nin-g̃ir_{2}-su ^{d}šara_{2}-bi ki e-ne-sur
	"Enlil, king of all the lands, father of all the gods, by his firm command, fixed the border between Ningirsu and Šara."
8–12	𒈨𒁲 𒈗𒆧𒆠𒆤 𒅗 𒀭𒅗𒁲𒈾𒋫 𒂠 𒃷 𒁉𒊏 𒆠𒁀 𒈾 𒉈𒆕
	me-silim lugal kiš^{ki}-ke_{4} inim ^{d}ištaran-na-ta eš_{2} gana_{2} be_{2}-ra ki-ba na bi_{2}-ru_{2}
	"Mesilim, king of Kiš, at the command of Ištaran, measured the field and set up a stele there."
13–17	𒍑 𒉺𒋼𒋛 𒄑𒆵𒆠𒆤 𒉆 𒅗𒈠 𒋛𒀀𒋛𒀀𒂠 𒂊𒀝
	uš ensi_{2} umma^{ki}-ke_{4} nam inim-ma diri-diri-še_{3} e-ak
	"Ush, ruler of Umma, acted unspeakably."
18–21	𒈾𒆕𒀀𒁉 𒉌𒉻 𒂔 𒉢𒁓𒆷𒆠𒂠 𒉌𒁺
	na-ru_{2}-a-bi i_{3}-pad edin lagaš^{ki}-še_{3} i_{3}-g̃en
	"He ripped out that stele and marched toward the plain of Lagaš."
22–27	𒀭𒊩𒌆𒄈𒋢 𒌨𒊕 𒀭𒂗𒆤𒇲𒆤 𒅗 𒋛𒁲𒉌𒋫 𒄑𒆵𒆠𒁕 𒁮𒄩𒊏 𒂊𒁕𒀝
	^{d}nin-g̃ir_{2}-su ur-sag ^{d}en-lil_{2}-la_{2}-ke_{4} inim si-sa_{2}-ni-ta umma^{ki}-da dam-ḫa-ra e-da-ak
	"Ningirsu, warrior of Enlil, at his just command, made war with Umma."
28–31	𒅗 𒀭𒂗𒆤𒇲𒋫 𒊓 𒌋 𒃲 𒉈𒌋 𒅖𒇯𒋺𒁉 𒂔𒈾𒆠 𒁀𒉌𒍑𒍑
	inim ^{d}en-lil_{2}-la_{2}-ta sa šu_{4} gal bi_{2}-šu_{4} SAḪAR.DU_{6}.TAKA_{4}-bi eden-na ki ba-ni-us_{2}-us_{2}
	"At Enlil's command, he threw his great battle net over it and heaped up burial mounds for it on the plain."
32–38	𒂍𒀭𒈾𒁺 𒉺𒋼𒋛 𒉢𒁓𒆷𒆠 𒉺𒄑𒉋𒂵 𒂗𒋼𒈨𒈾 𒉺𒋼𒋛 𒉢𒁓𒆷𒆠𒅗𒆤
	e_{2}-an-na-tum_{2} ensi_{2} lagaš^{ki} pa-bil_{3}-ga en-mete-na ensi_{2} lagaš^{ki}-ka-ke_{4}
	"Eannatum, ruler of Lagash, uncle of Entemena, ruler of Lagaš"
39–42	𒂗𒀉𒆗𒇷 𒉺𒋼𒋛 𒄑𒆵𒆠𒁕 𒆠 𒂊𒁕𒋩
	en-a_{2}-kal-le ensi_{2} umma^{ki}-da ki e-da-sur
	"fixed the border with Enakalle, ruler of Umma"

=== Net cylinder of Entemena ===
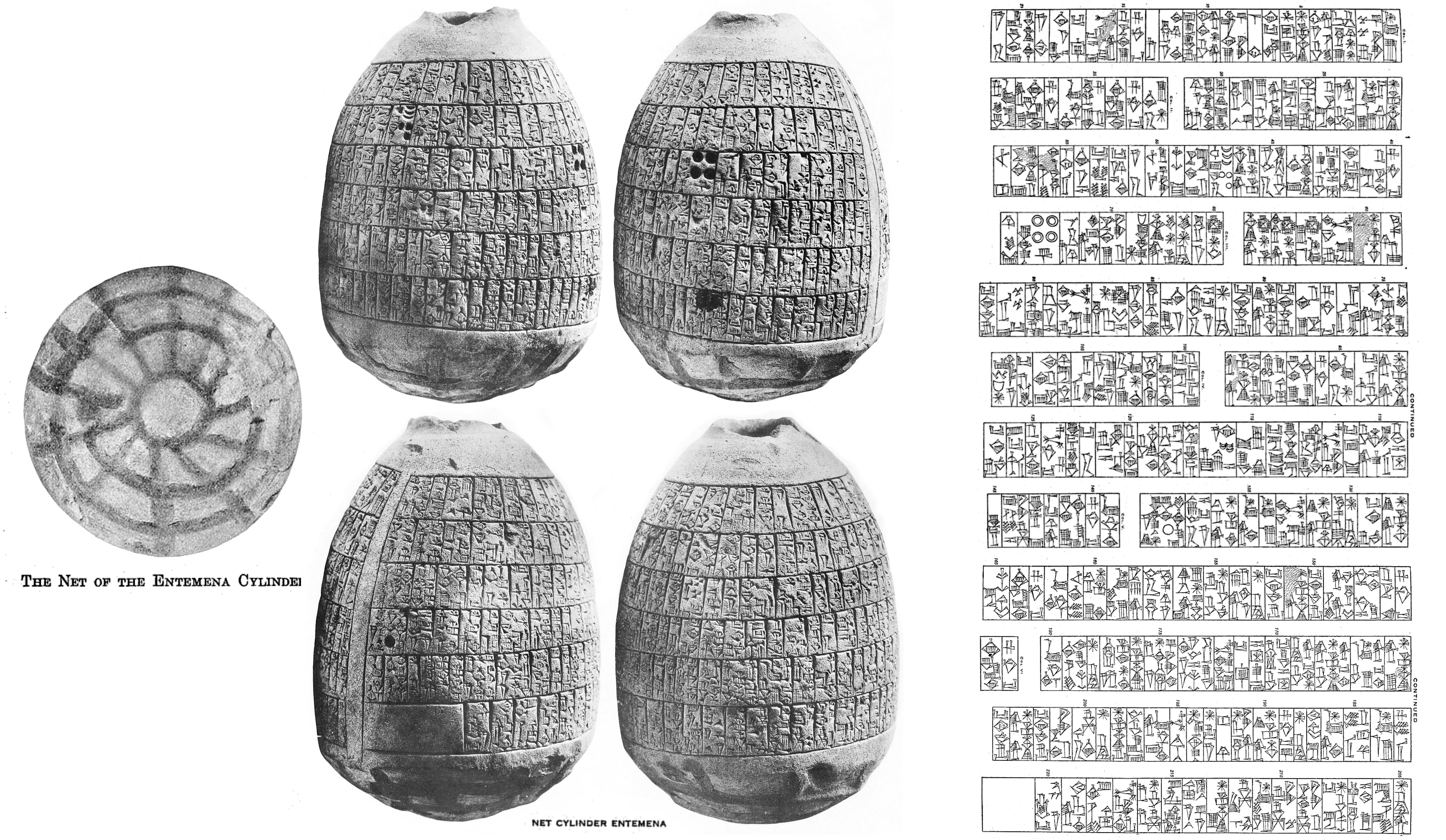
"Net cylinder" of Entemena, the second known cylinder describing the border conflict between Lagash and Umma. The textual content is identical to the cone cylinder.

The "Net cylinder" of Entemena is a cylinder of a peculiar design, with a net pattern on the bottom, which is the second known cylinder describing the border conflict between Lagash and Umma. The content is identical to the cone cylinder. It is located in the Yale Babylonian Collection.

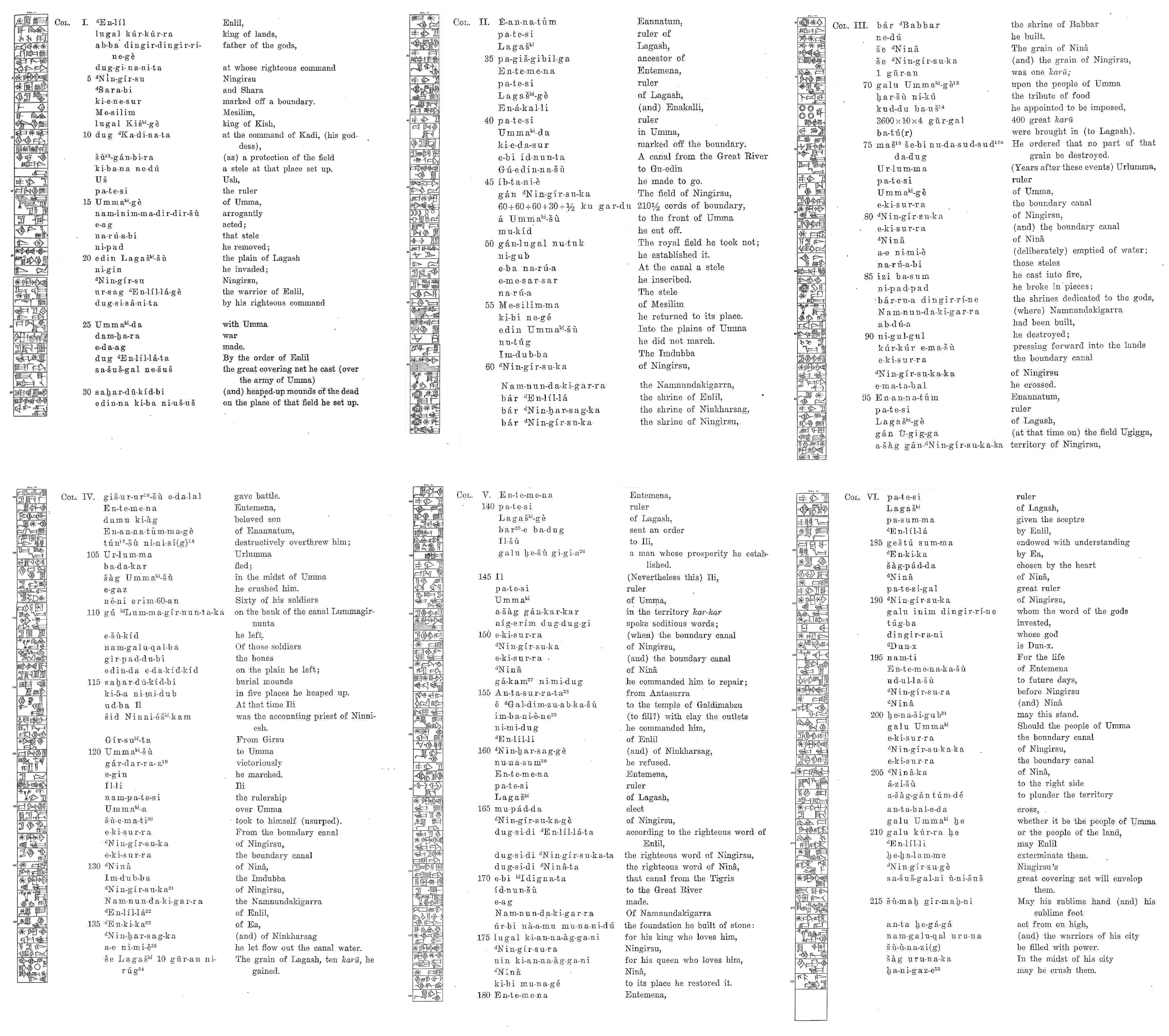
Full text of the War inscription by Entemena, in the Net Cylinder

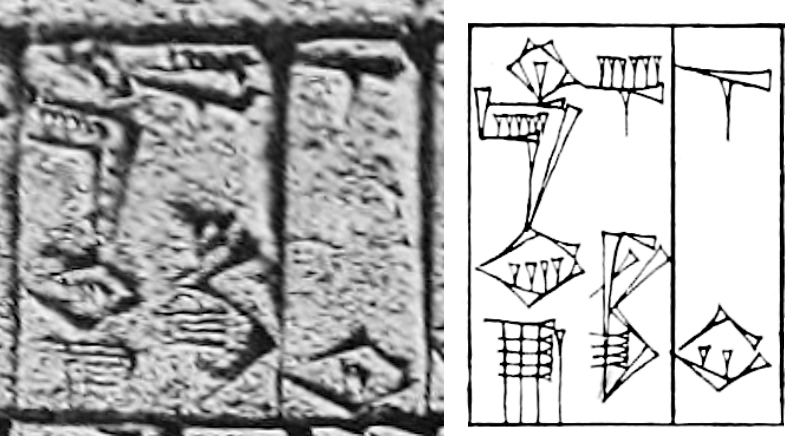
Mesilim Lugal Kish-ki (𒈨𒁲 𒈗 𒆧𒆠), "Mesilim, King of Kish", on the "Net Cylinder" of Entemena

== Statue of Entemena ==
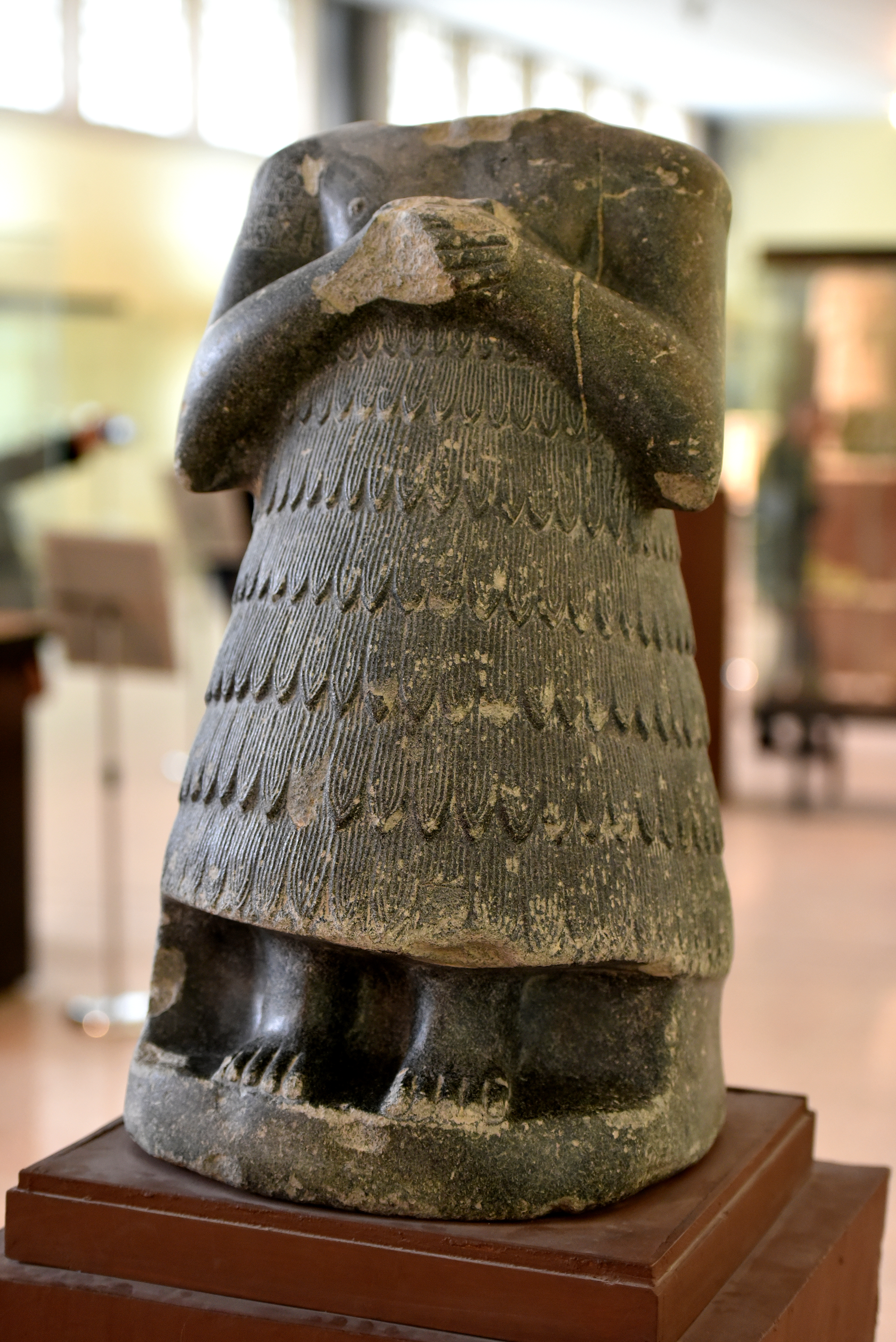
The statue of Entemena back in the National Museum of Iraq, following its rescue

Entemena has one of the earliest statues of a known king from Mesopotamia. It is made of diorite, and is 76 centimeters tall. Entemena, although ruler of the city-state of Lagash, wears the typical dress of a devotee: a kaunakes fleeced skirt with a tassel in the back. He is clasping his hands at the chest, in a typical pose of perpetual attendance before the deity.

The statue of Entemena reflects a style of which a few other examples are known from Mesopotamia, such as the statue of Ikun-Shamash from Mari, the statue of Enzi from Der, or the statue of Lugal-dalu, which still has its head intact.

The statue of Entemena has a very long cuneiform inscription on the side (right arm) and on the back. It includes the names and titles of Entemena, and the mention "Enlil (the supreme Sumerian god) loves Entemena".

The statue was housed in the National Museum of Iraq. In May 2003 the statue was stolen during the 2003 invasion of Iraq. It was found in New York and returned in 2010.

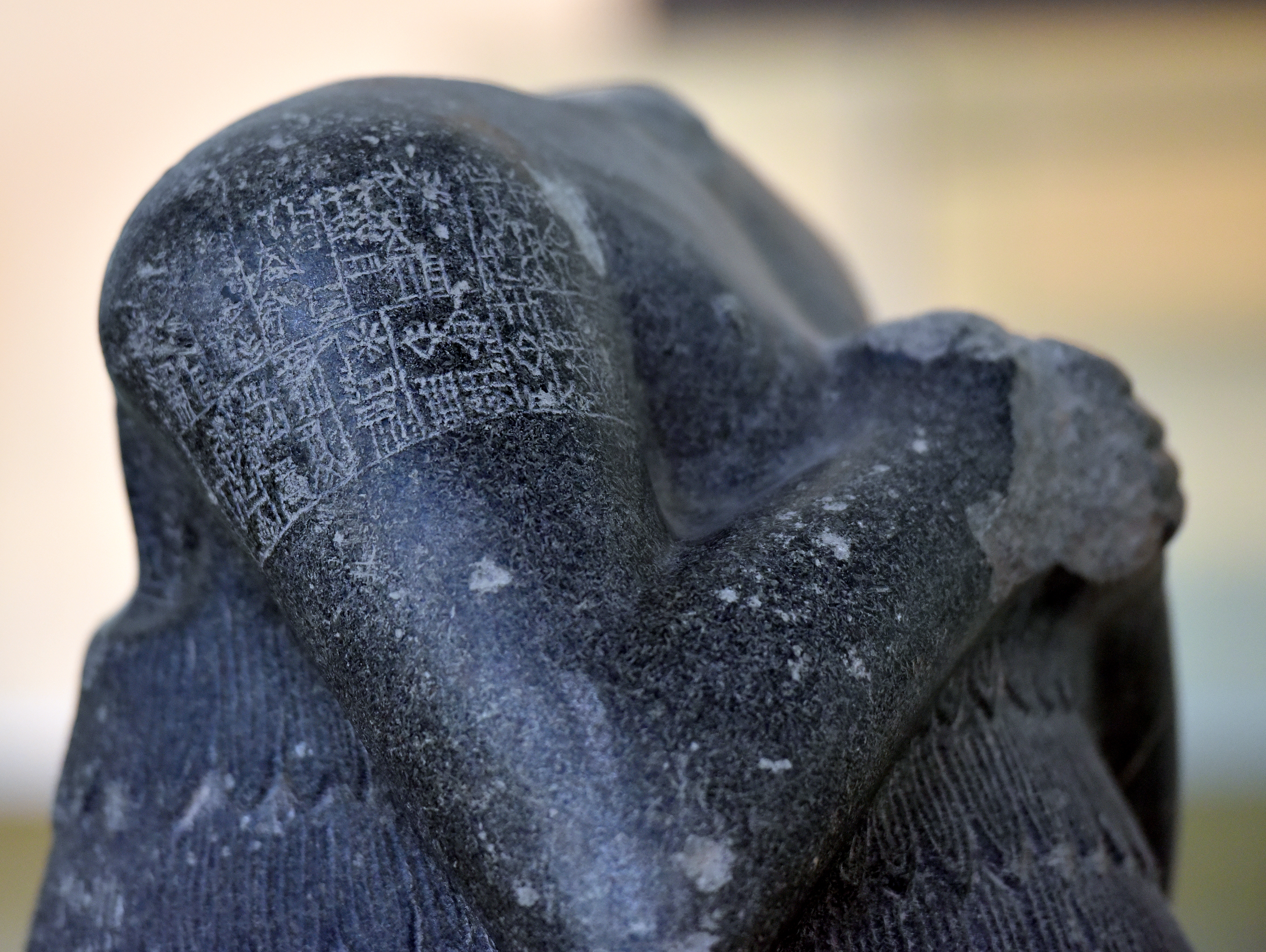
Detail showing the cuneiform inscription on the right upper arm of the statue of Entemena

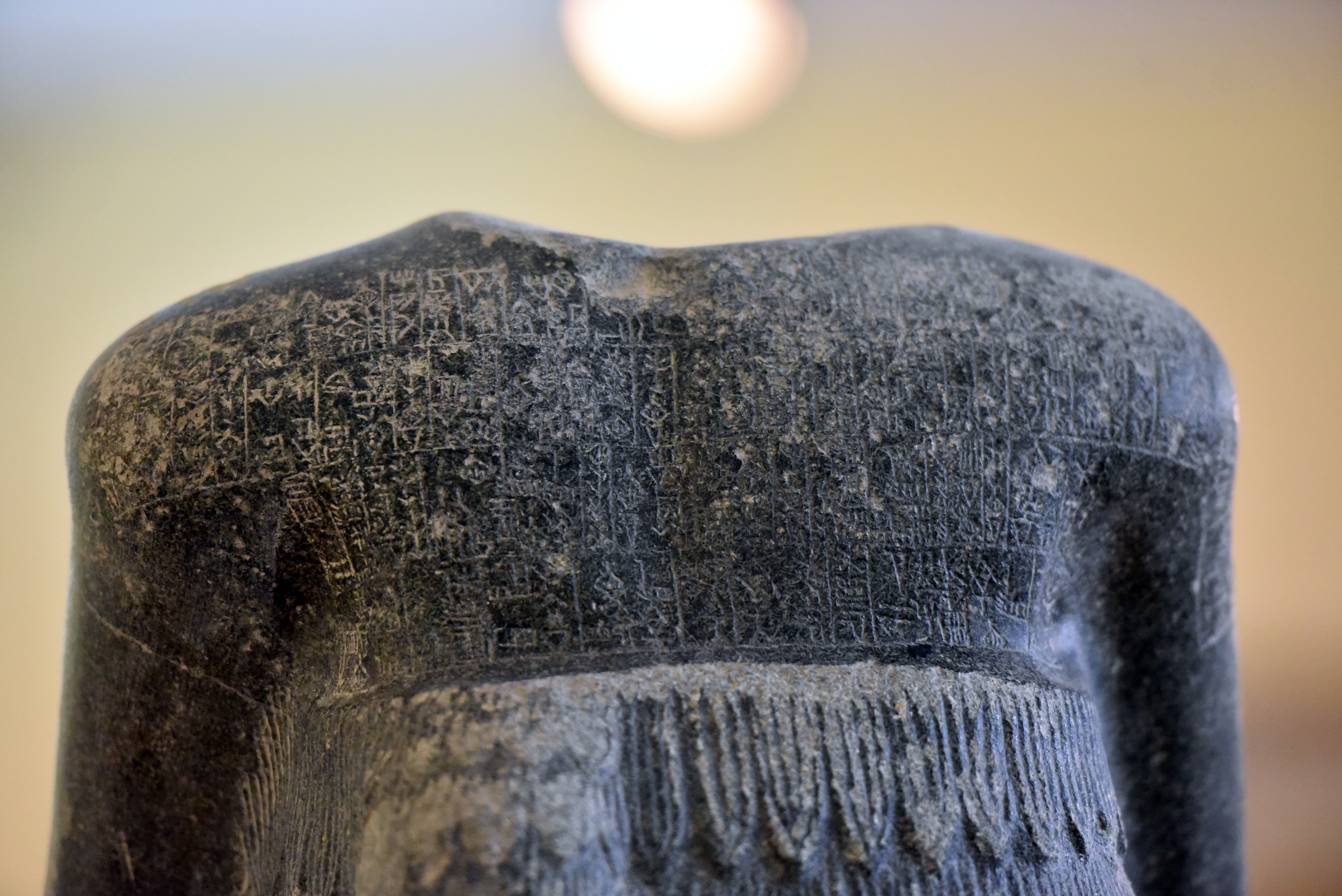
Detail showing the cuneiform inscription on the back of the upper torso of the statue of Entemena

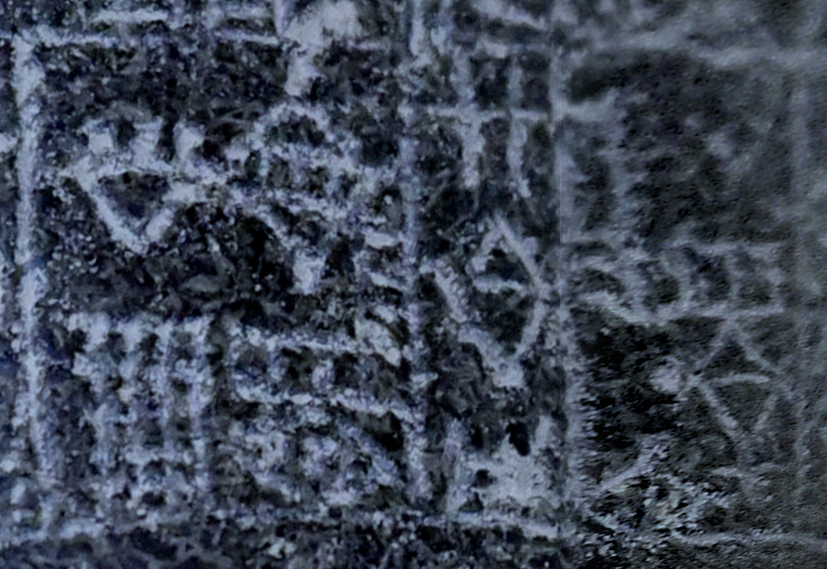
"Entemena ensi of Lagash" (𒂗𒋼𒈨𒈾 𒑐𒋼𒋛 𒉢𒁓𒆷𒆠) on the right shoulder of the statue of Entemena

== Silver vase of Entemena ==
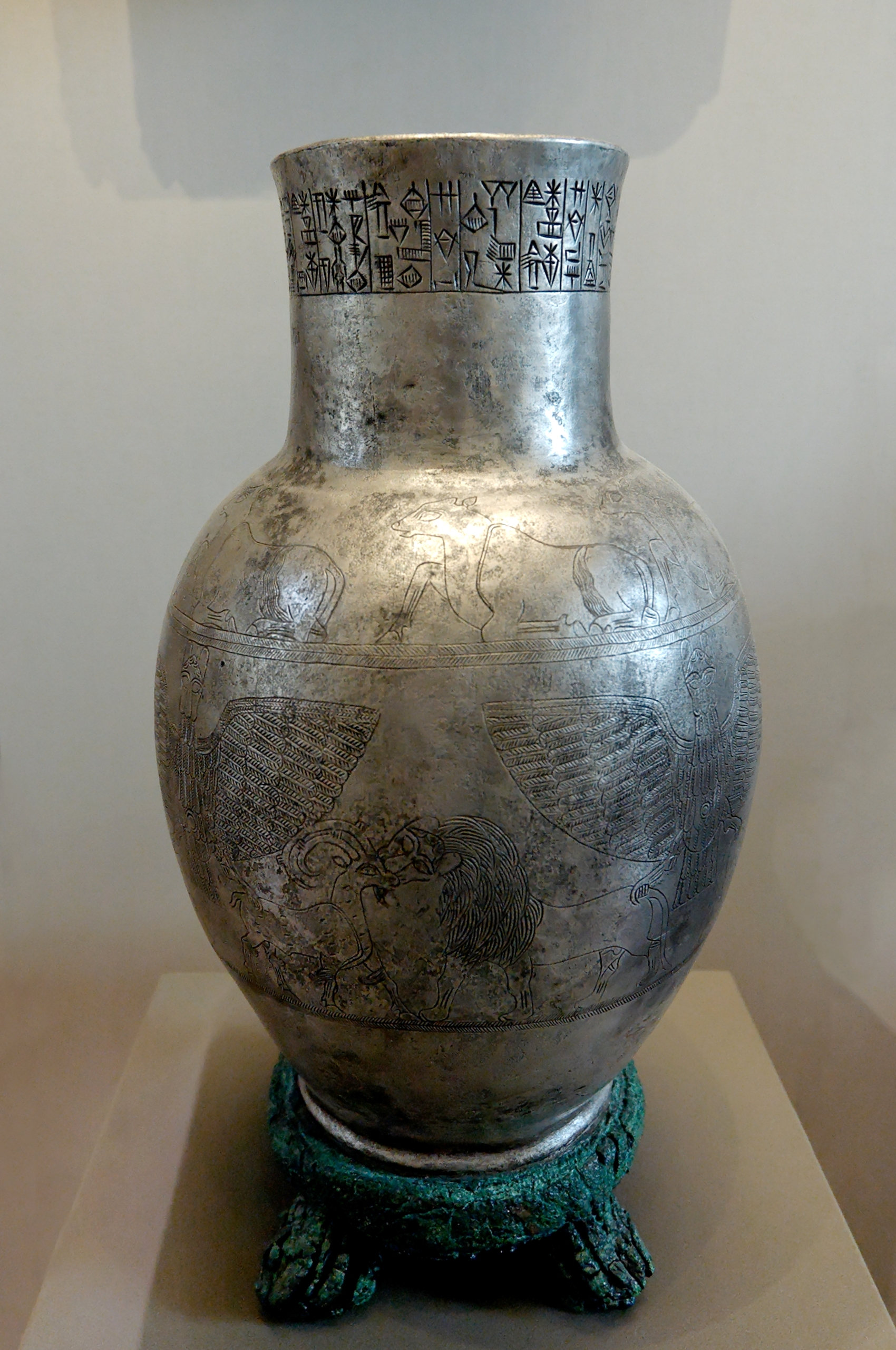
Silver vase, with decorated panels, inscribed with cuneiform around rim. Louvre Museum.

A tripod of silver dedicated by Entemena to his god is now in the Louvre. A frieze of lions devouring ibexes and deer, incised with great artistic skill, runs round the neck, while the eagle crest of Lagash adorns the globular part. The vase is a proof of the high degree of excellence to which the goldsmith's art had already attained. A vase of calcite, also dedicated by Entemena, has been found at Nippur. The inscription of the neck of the silver vase reads:

"For Ningirsu, the foremost warrior of Enlil. Entemena, the ensi of Lagash, whom Nanshe had chosen in her heart, the great ensi of Ningirsu, the son of Enannatum, the ensi of Lagash, made for Ningirsu, the king who loved him, a vase of pure silver and stone (?), out of which Ningirsu drinks, and brought it to the Ningirsu of the Eninnu, for his life. At that time, Dudu was the sanga of Ningirsu."

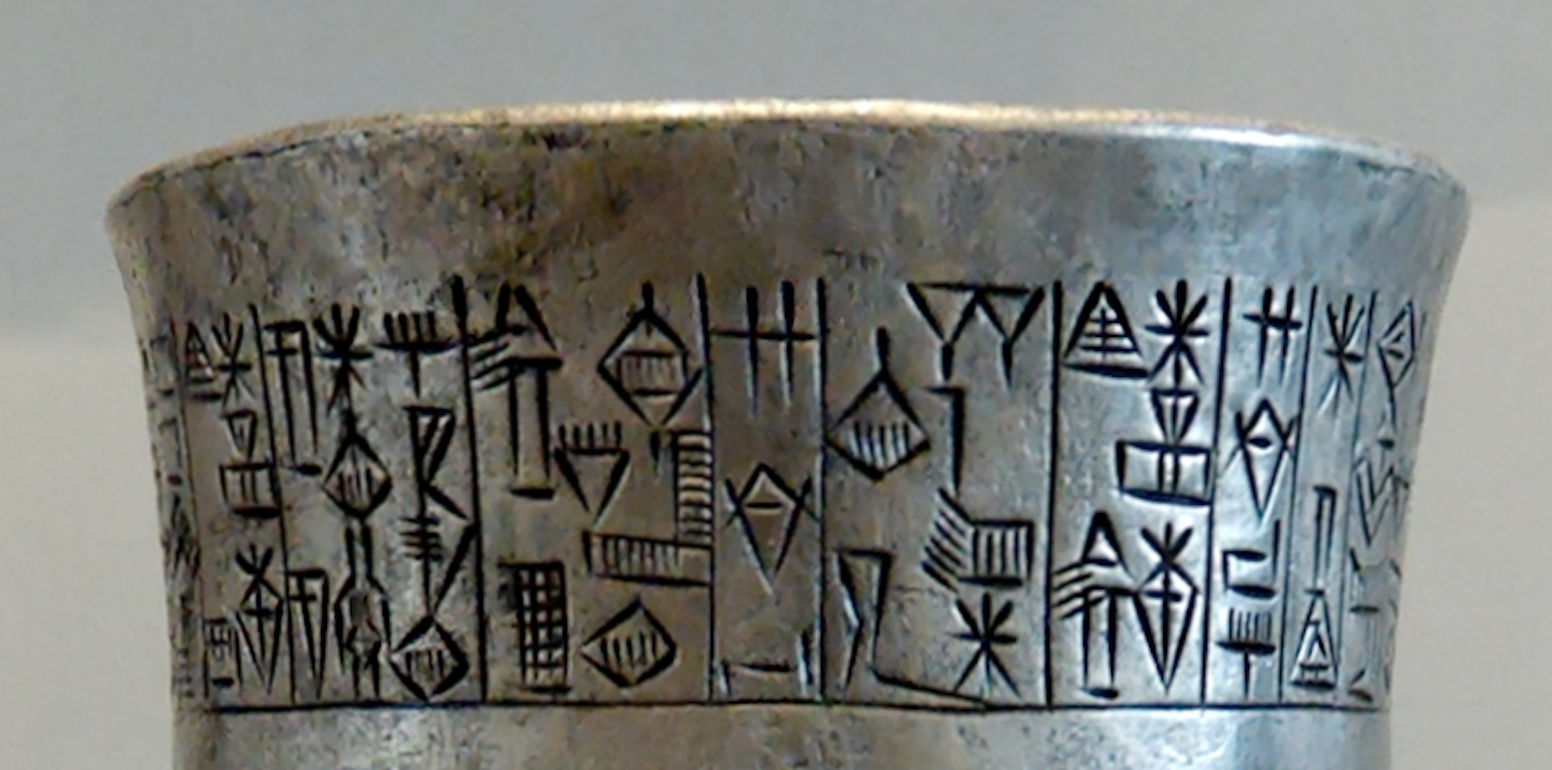
Cuneiform dedication on the vase of Entemena.

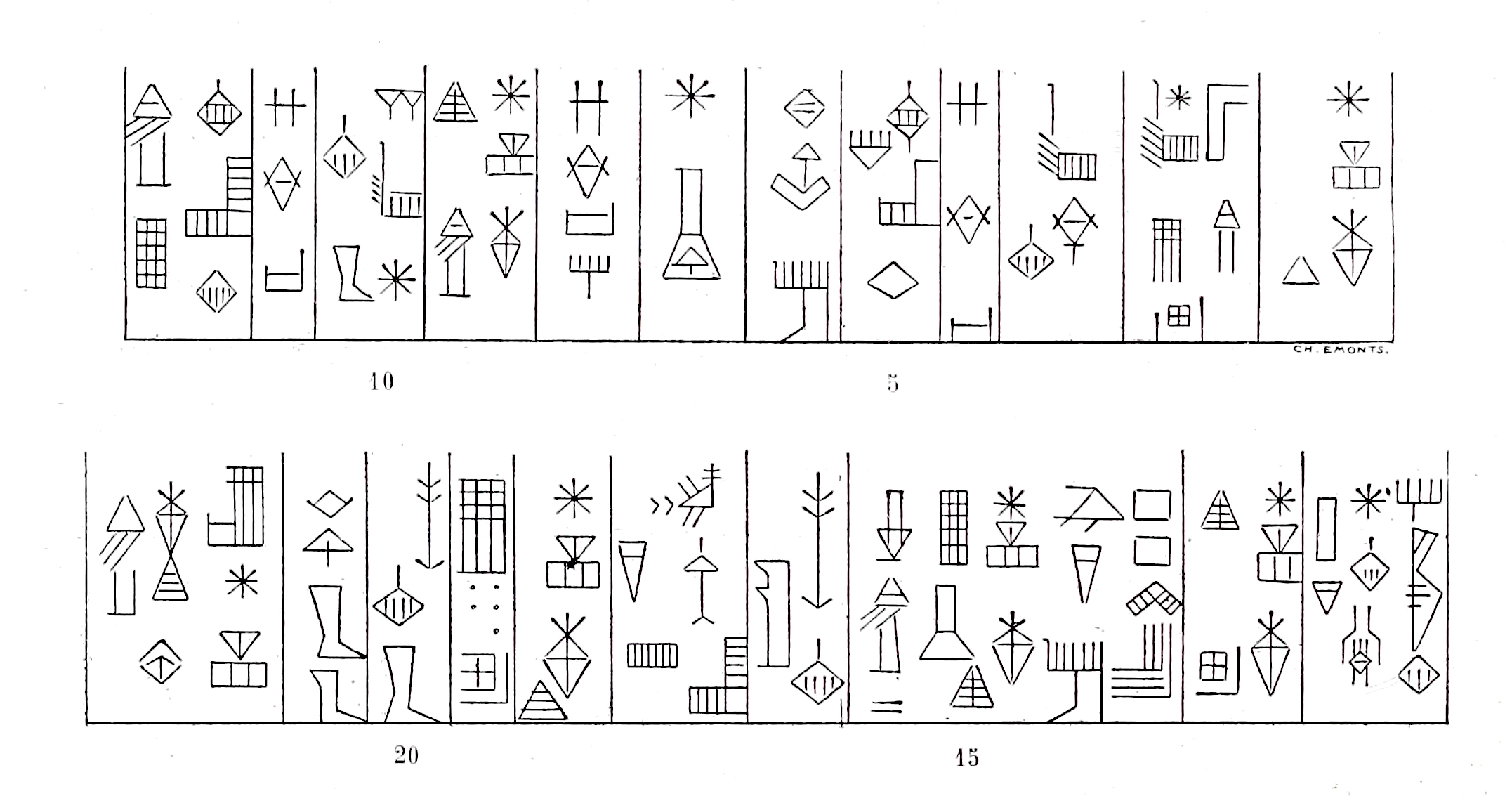
Entemena vase inscription.

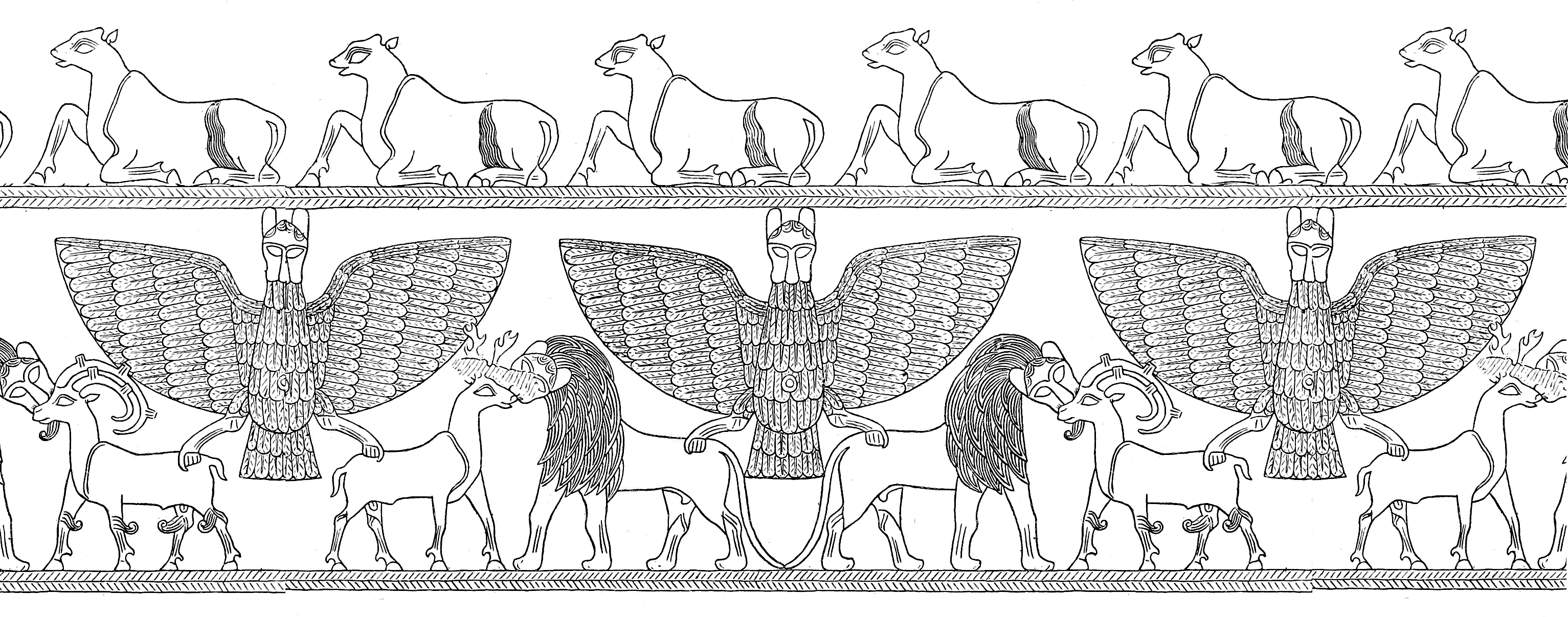
Entemena vase motif, with the eagle of Lagash.

== Foundation tablets ==
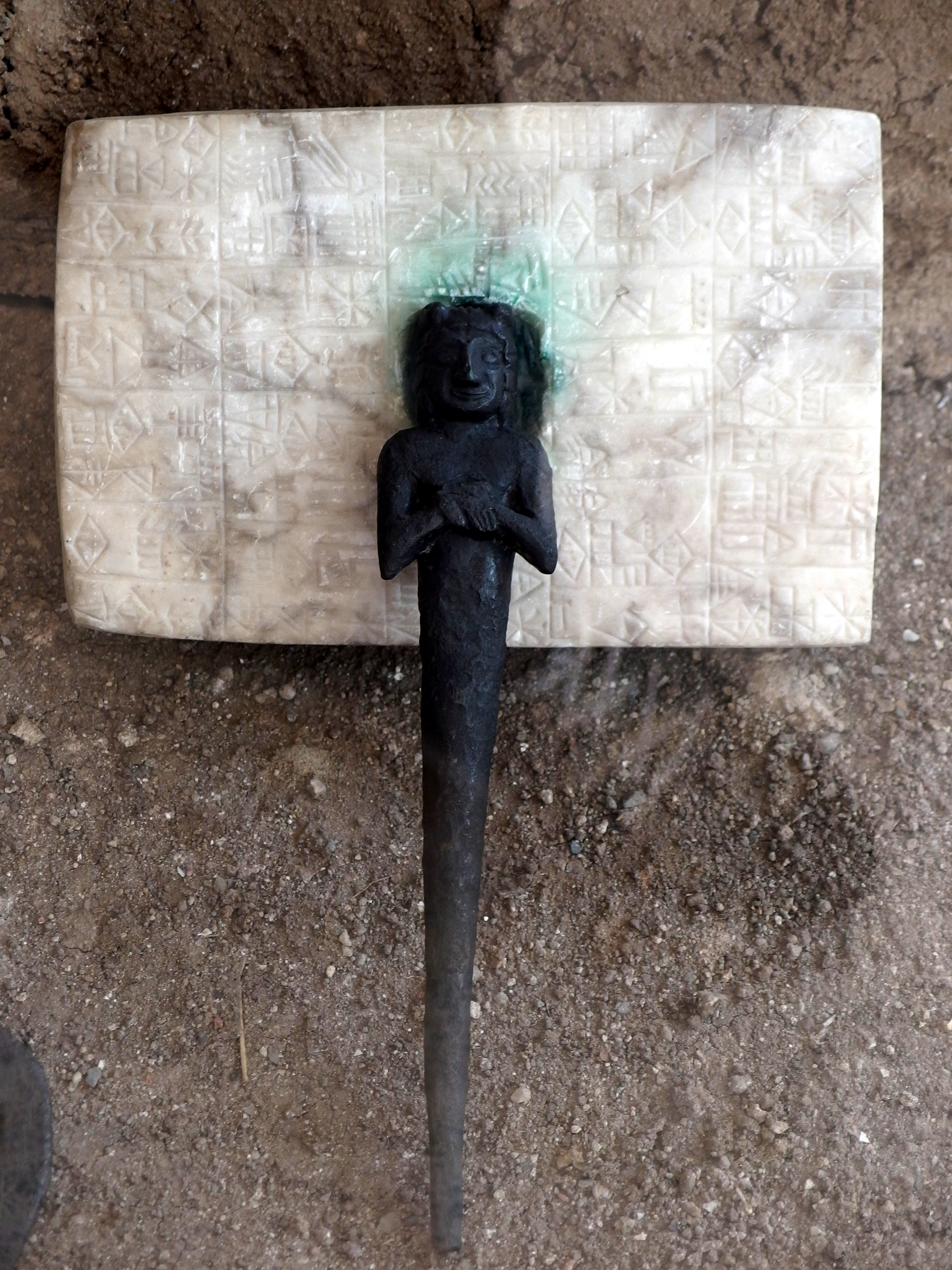
A votive tablet of Entemena, made of alabaster, with its foundation nail. Museum of the Ancient Orient, Istanbul.

Several votive tablets in the name of Entemena are known. They usually records Entemena's name, title and filiation, and his accomplishment in establishing temples or devotional images. The tablets are often associated with a "foundation nail", called temen ("foundation") in Sumerian, which was inserted into the ground under the foundation of temples, together with the inscribed tablets and offerings such as jewelry or small statuettes of protective divinities. A proclamation on one of the foundation stones of Enmetena says that he "instituted liberty in Lagash. He restored the child to its mother, and the mother to her child; he cancelled interest." This is the first known mention of the word ama-gi, translated here as liberty.

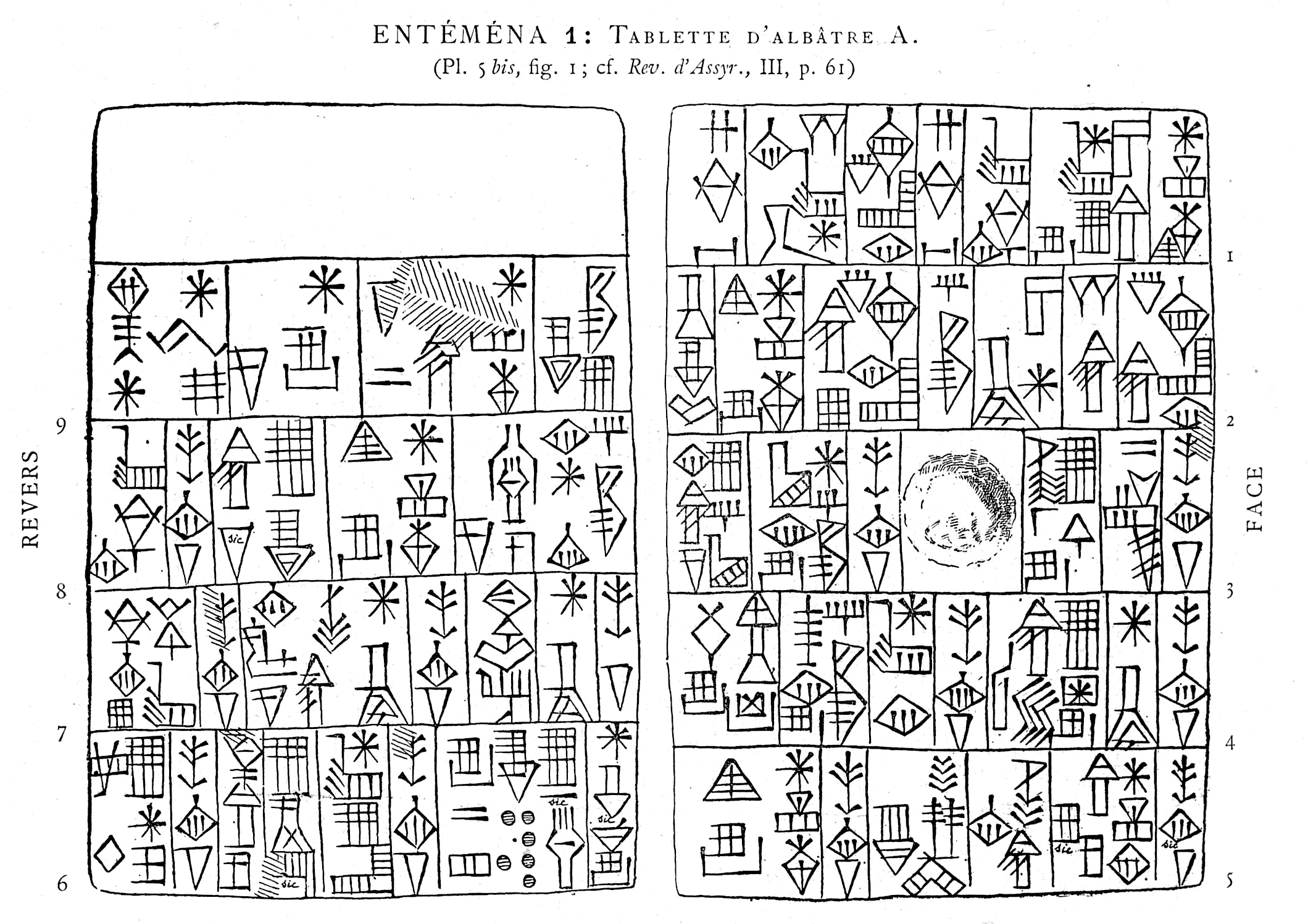
An inscription of Entemena to Ningirsu: "... Entemena, ensi of Lagash, son of Enannatum, ensi of Lagash, grandson of Ur-Nanshe, king of Lagash ...".

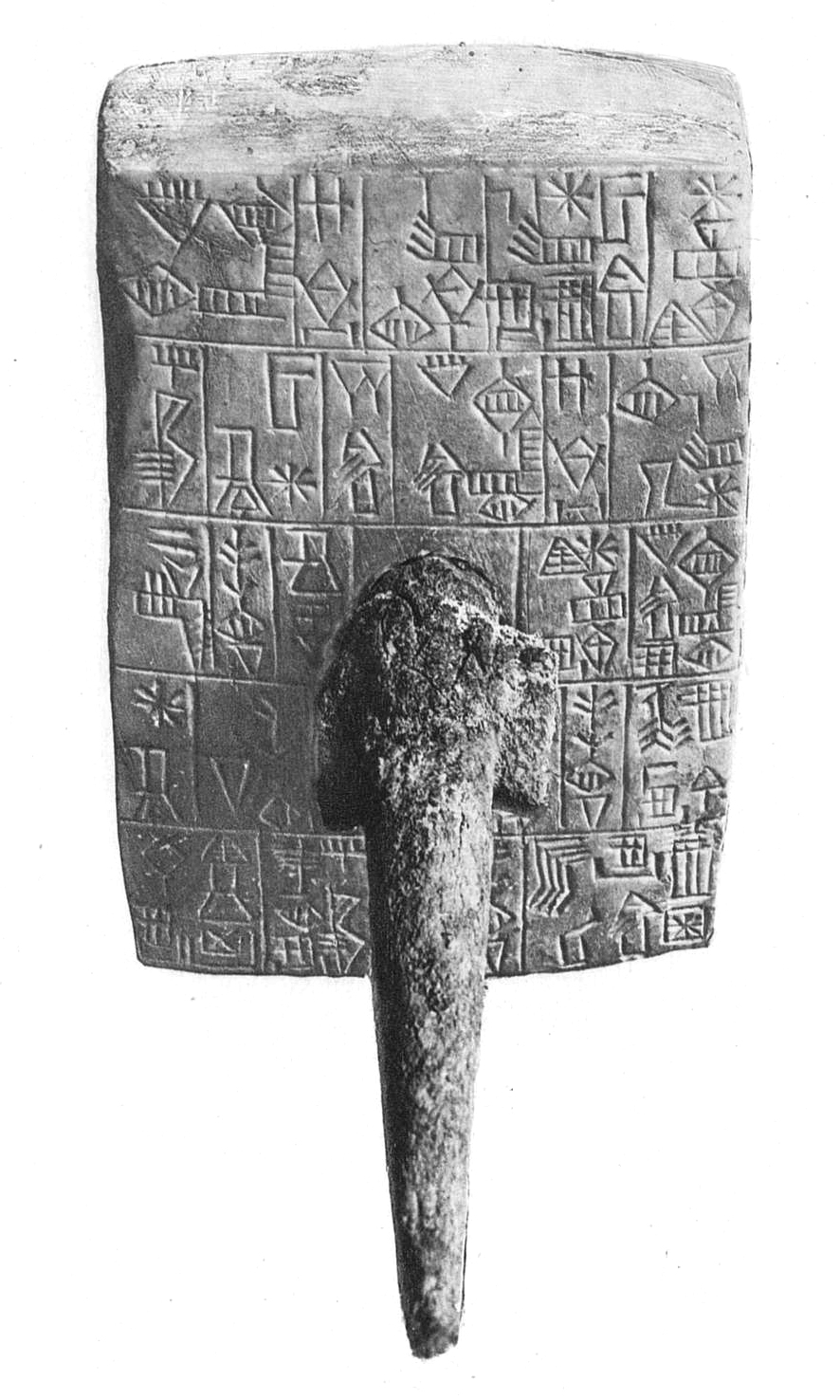
Votive tablet of Entemena to Ningirsu: "... Entemena, ensi of Lagash, son of Enannatum, ensi of Lagash, grandson of Ur-Nanshe, king of Lagash ...".

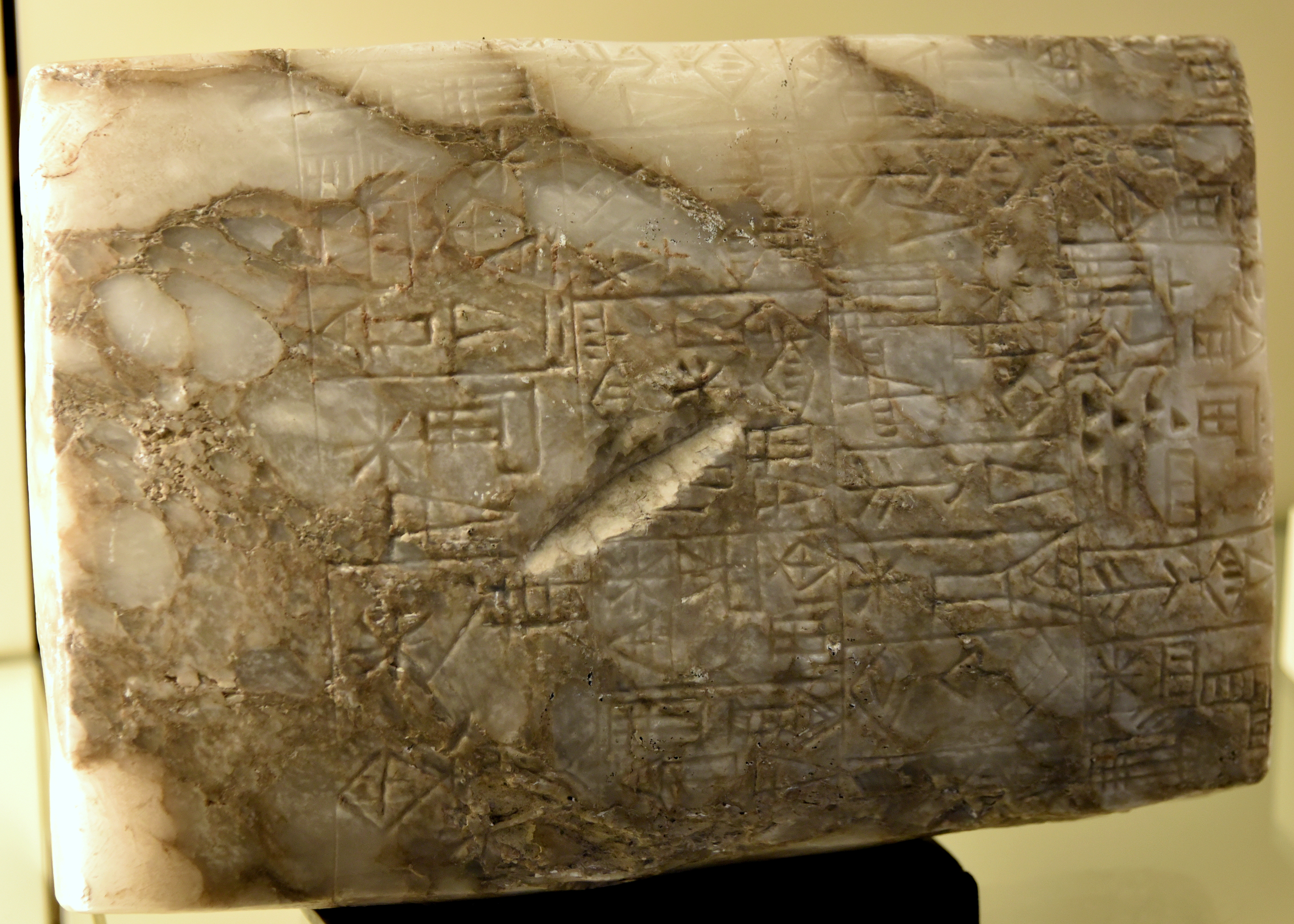
Inscribed stone tablet of Entemena. Pergamon Museum.

== Perforated plate of Dudu ==
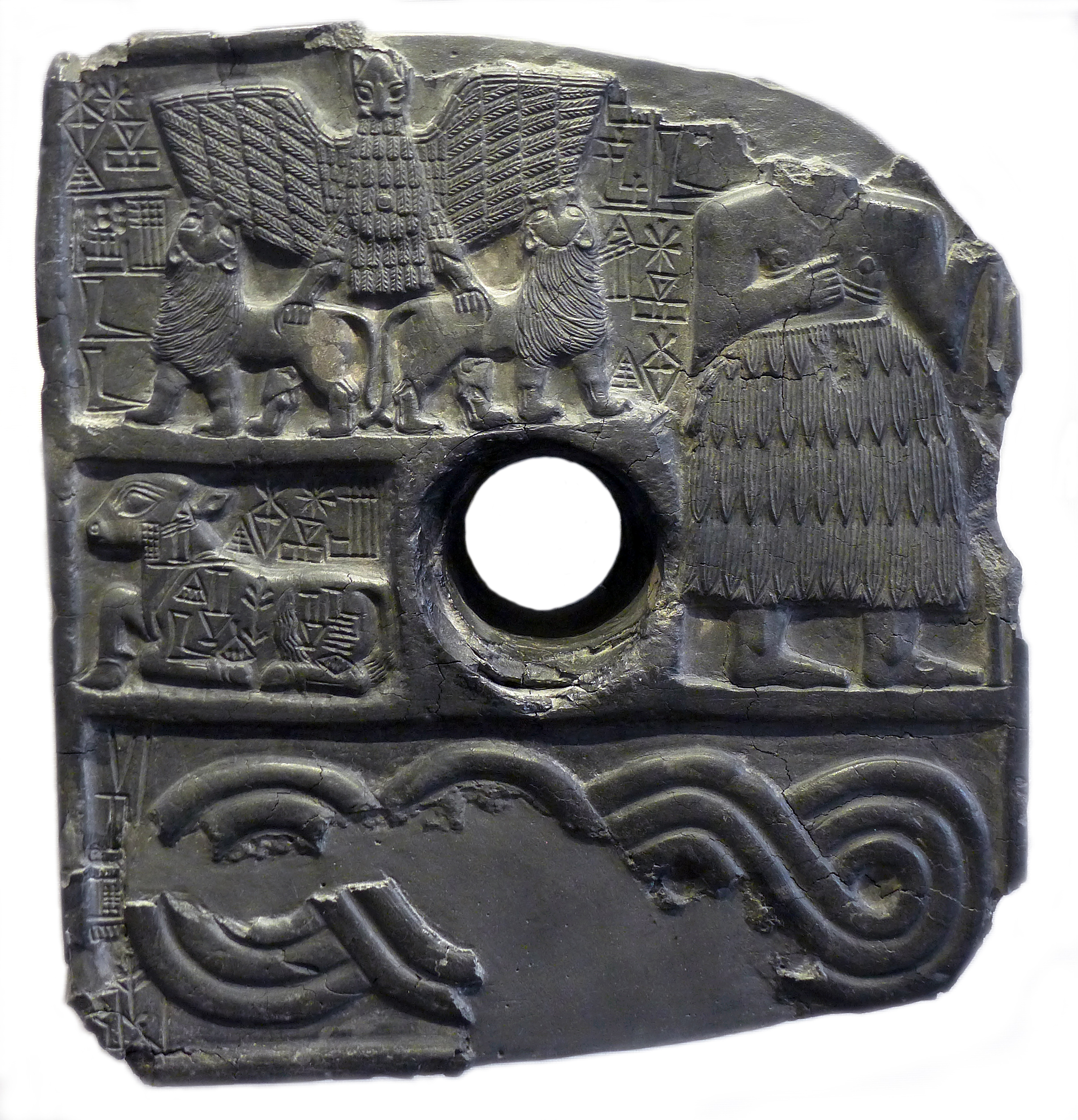
Votive plaque of Dudu, Priest of Ningirsu, during the reign of Entemena, Patesi of Shirpurla. Louvre Museum.

Another artifact related to Entemena is a votive plaque bearing the name of Dudu, priest of Lagash for Ningirsu in Entemena's time. Dudu is known as priest of Lagash under Entemena from the last line of the inscription on the silver vase of Entemena. The plate was made out of bitumen, a rather distinctive feature, as most such plaques were made of limestone or gypsum. The plaque depicts various scenes: a standing man in a kaunakes holding a walking stick, a resting cow, and the symbol of Lagash: an eagle (Anzû) holding two lions, although the lions are uncharacteristically biting back at the wings of the eagle. A symbolic wave pattern at the bottom of the plate is thought to symbolize the flow of water.

It is inscribed with the following text: "For Ningirsu of the Eninnu, Dudu, priest of Ningirsu ... brought [this material] and fashioned it as a mace stand." The exact function of the plaque is unknown: it has been interpreted as a mace-holder, a plaque to be nailed into the wall of a temple, or a door panel.

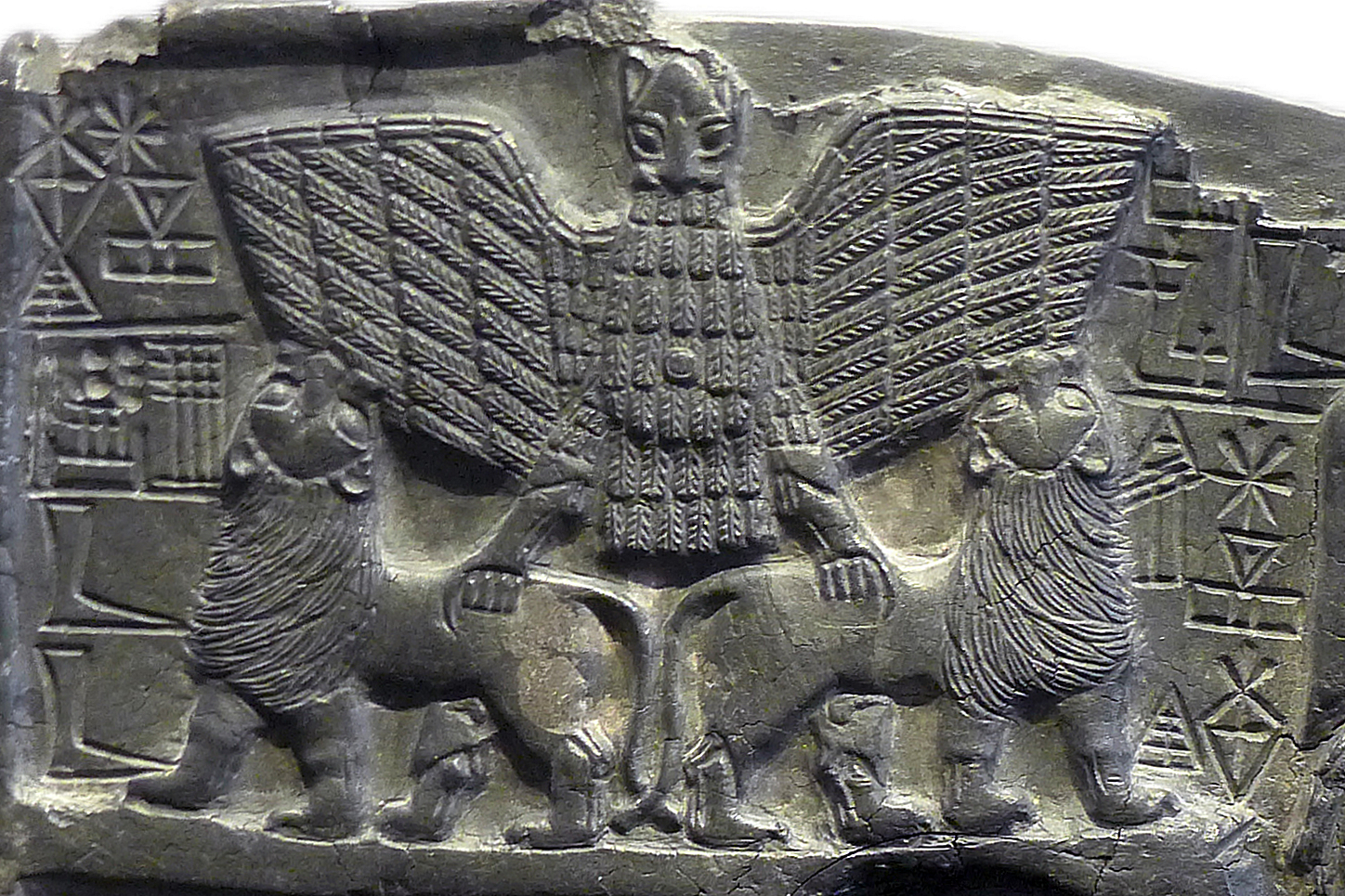
The eagle, symbol of Lagash, at the time of Entemena

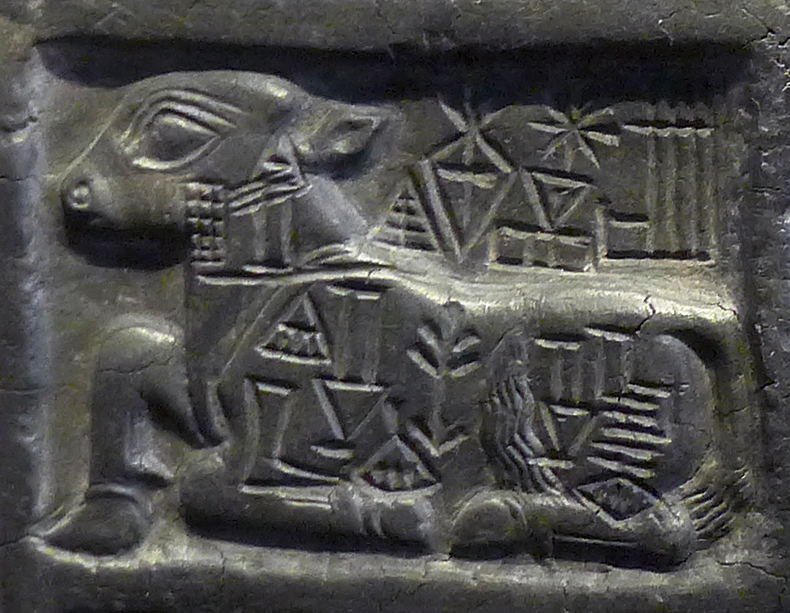
The resting cow

== Other artifacts ==
Door sockets in the name of Entemena, or the plaque of the priest Dudu, associated with Entemena in another inscription, are among the other famous artifacts related to Entemena.

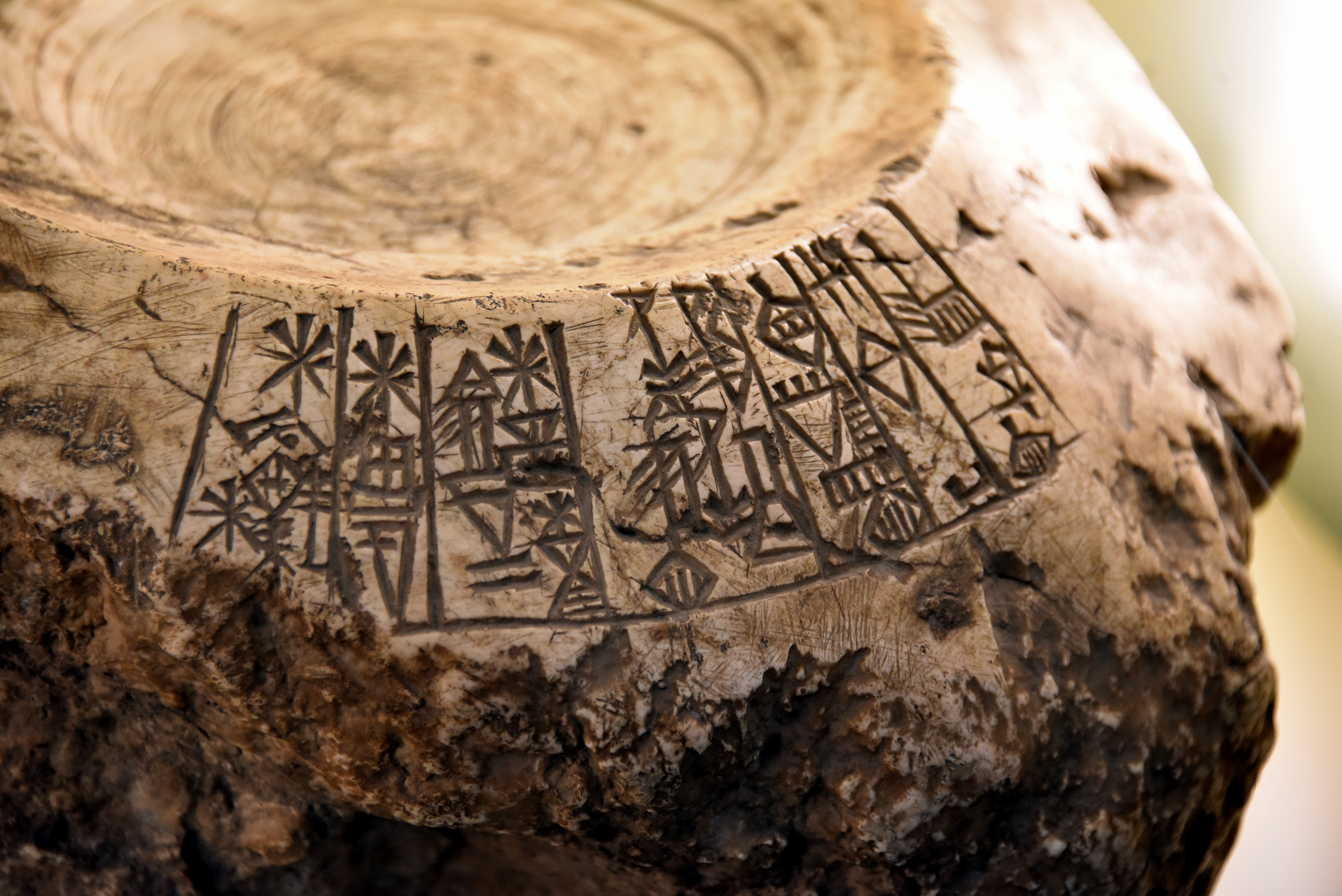
Detail of a door-socket, inscribed with the name of Entemena. Vorderasiatisches Museum, Germany.

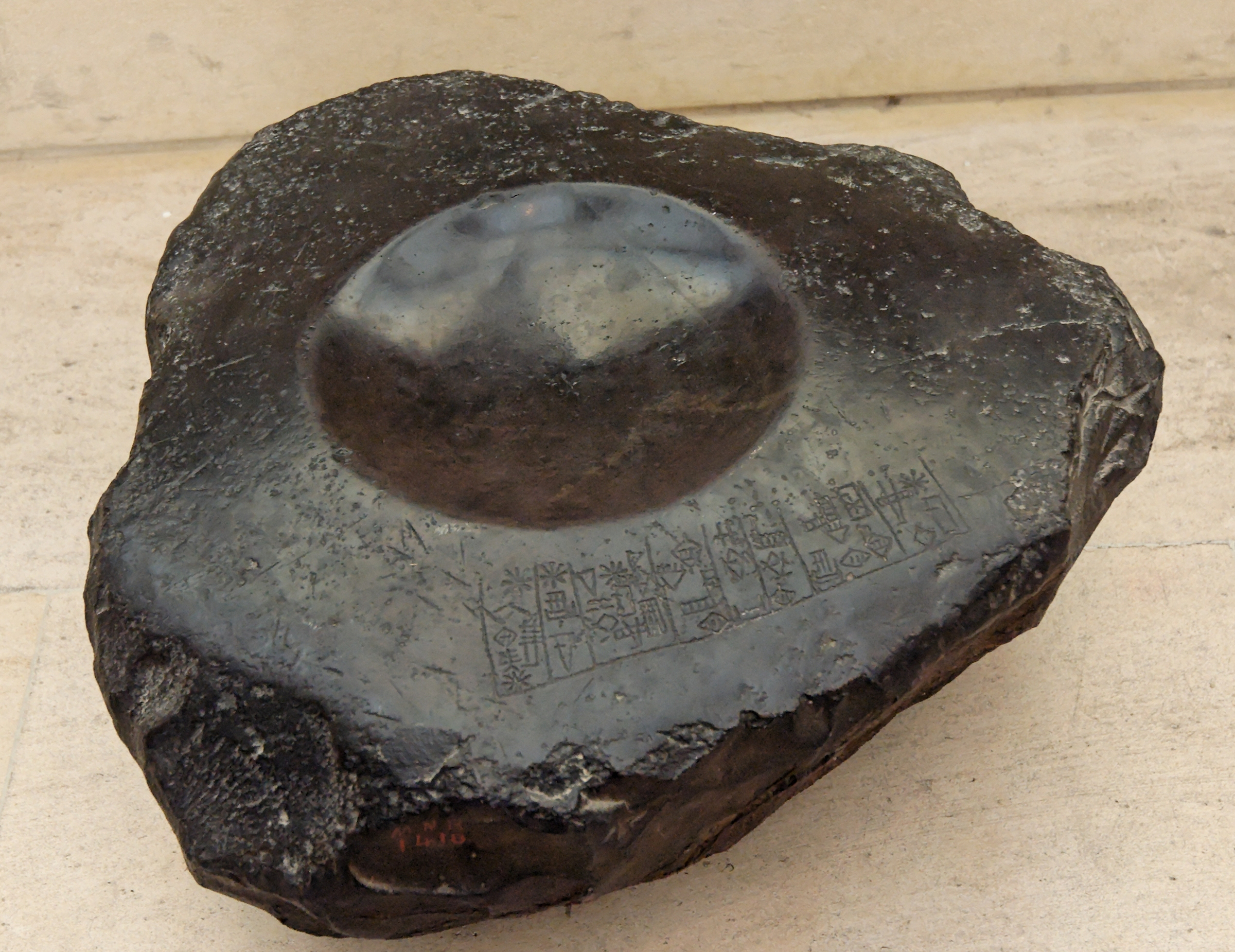
Tael (door socket) of Entemena, with cuneiform inscription. Louvre Museum

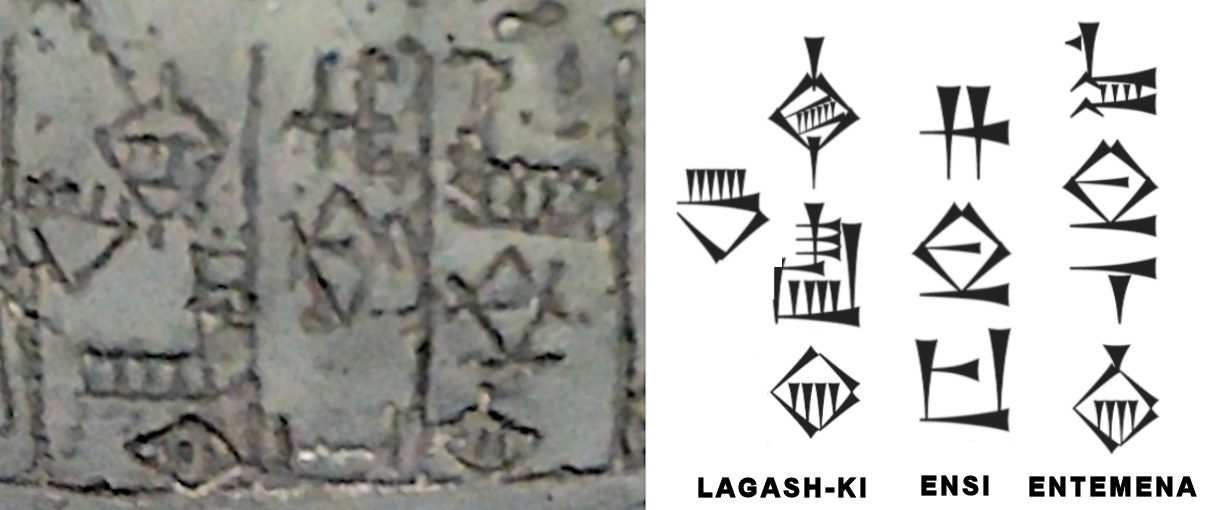
Entemena Ensi Lagashki, "Entemena, Ensi of Lagash"

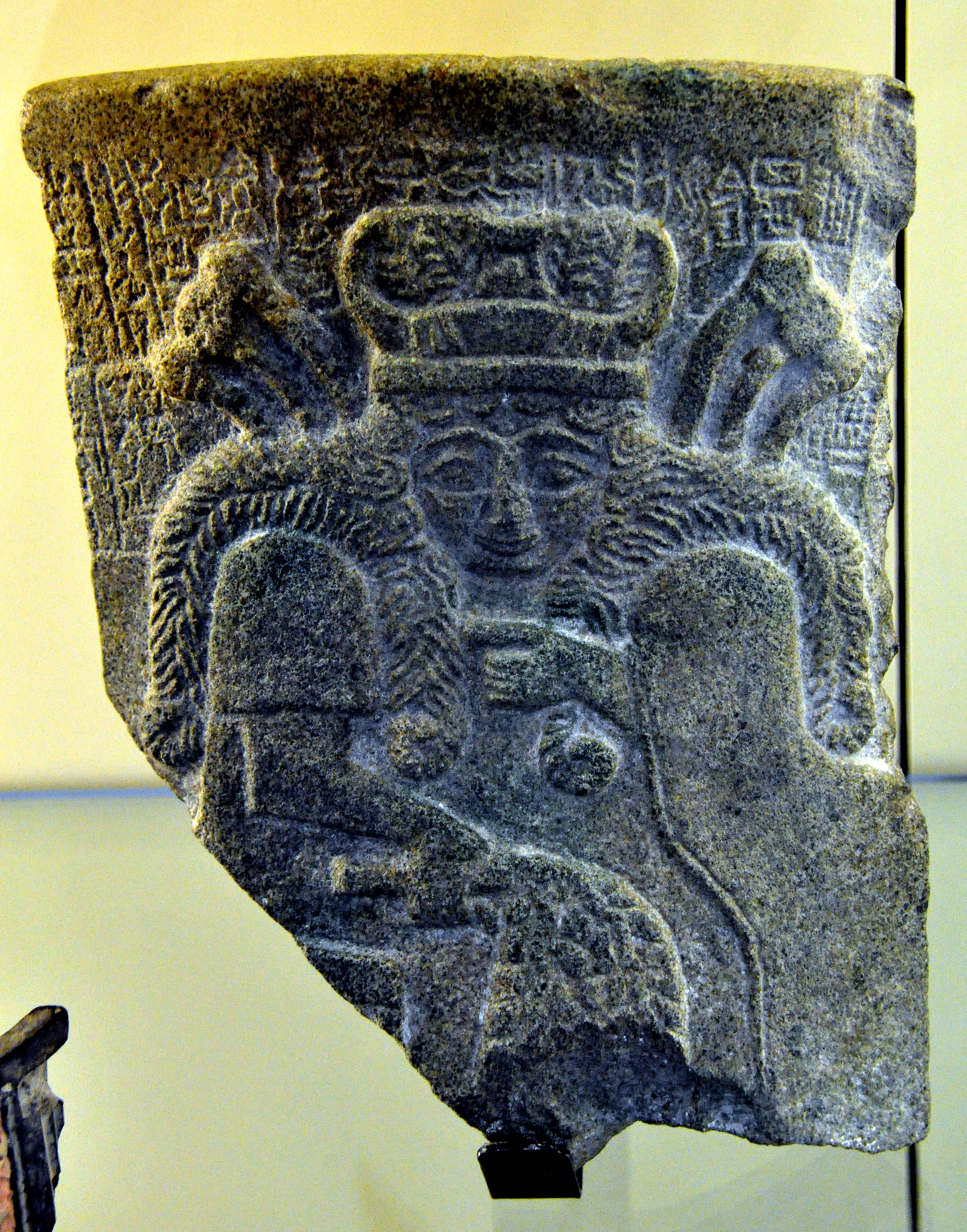
Sumerian goddess Nisaba, the name of Entemena is inscribed, c. 2430 BC, from Iraq. Vorderasiatisches Museum, Germany

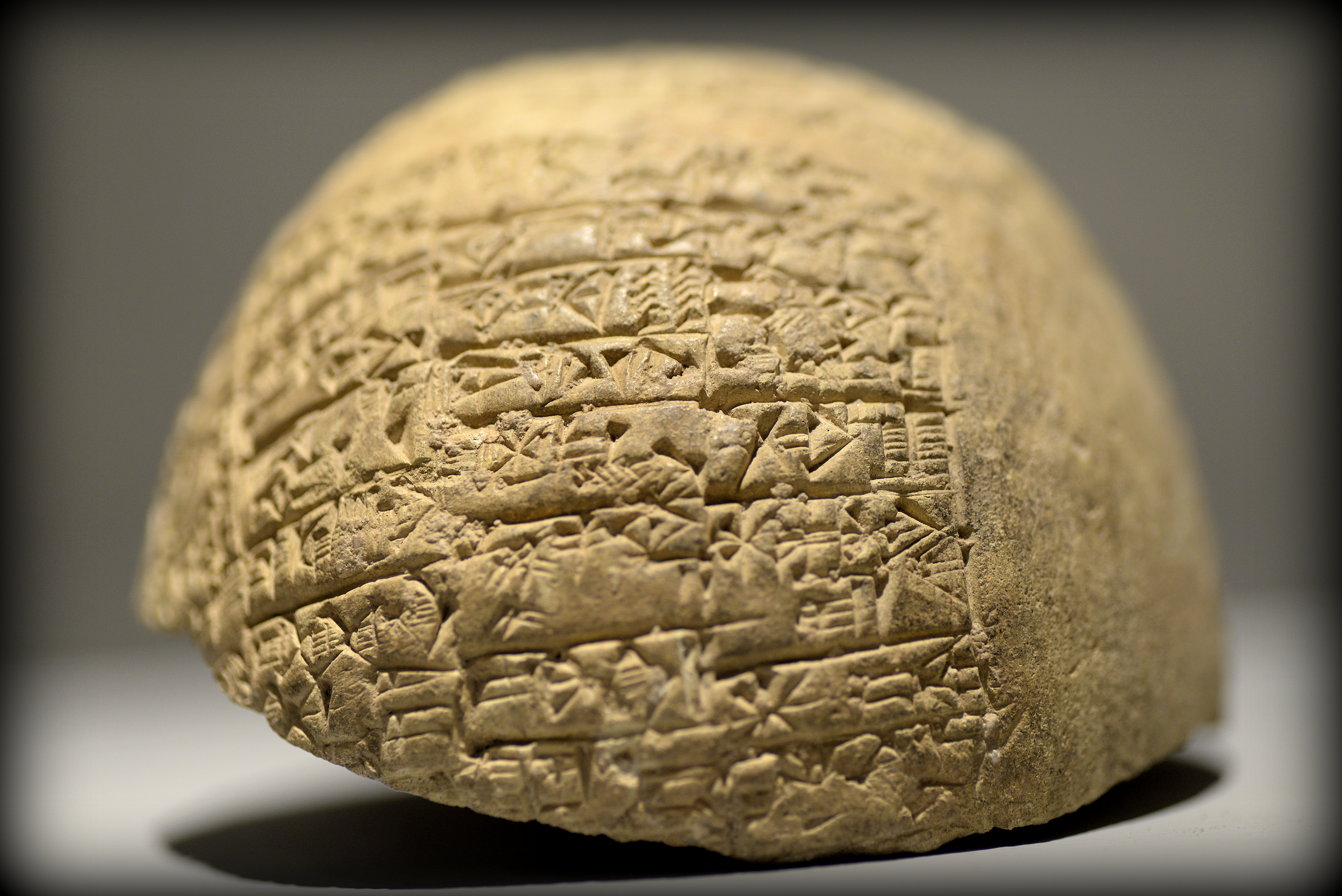
An Inscribed stand's head mentioning the name of Entemena, ruler of Lagash, c. 2400 BCE. Sulaymaniyah Museum, Iraq

Regnal titles
Preceded by Enannatum	King of Lagash c. 2400 BC	Succeeded by Enannatum II
