= Enannatum II =

Enannatum II 𒂗𒀭𒈾𒁺
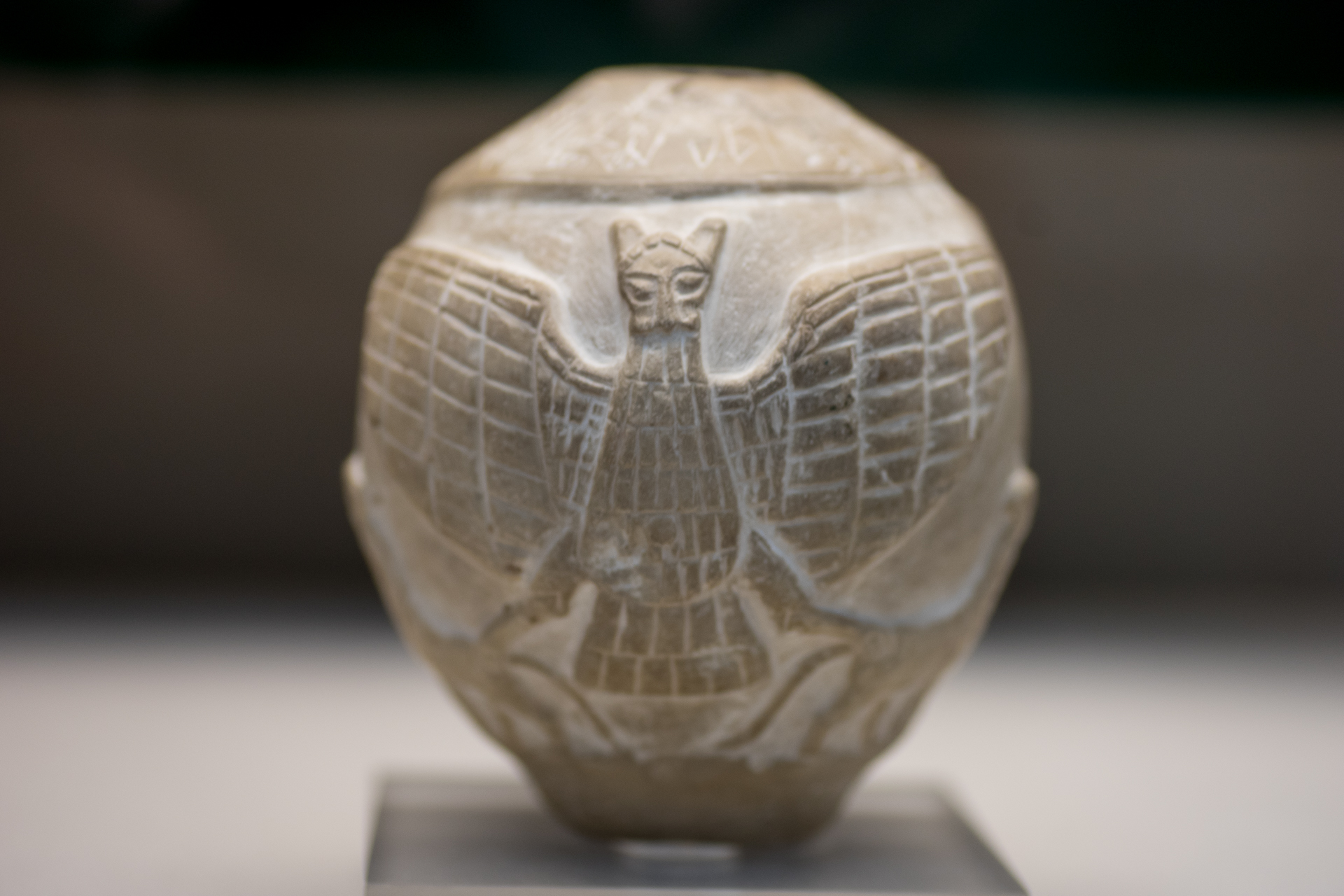
- Mace head with the eagle of Lagash, dedicated to the life of Enannatum, possibly Enannatum II

King of Lagash
- Reign: c. 2400 BC
- Predecessor: Entemena
- Successor: Enentarzi
- Issue: Lummadur
- Dynasty: 1st Dynasty of Lagash
- Father: Entemena

Location of Lagash

Enannatum II (Sumerian: 𒂗𒀭𒈾𒁺, EN.AN.NA-tum_{2}; fl. c. 2400 BC), son of Entemena, was Ensi (governor) of Lagash.

Only a few inscriptions of Enannatum II are known, suggesting a short reign. One of these inscriptions, of which four nearly identical instances are known, appears on a door socket from the great storehouse of Ningirsu at Lagash, which he restored:

For Ningirsu, the foremost warrior of Enlil. Enannatum, the ensi of Lagash, whom Nanshe had chosen in her heart, the great ensi of Ningirsu, the son of Entemena, the ensi of Lagash, restored for Ningirsu his brewery. The god of Enannatum, the man who restored the brewery, is Shulutula

— Door socket inscription of Enannatum II.

He had a son named Lummadur, the last representative of the house of Ur-Nanshe, who apparently never held an official title. It seems that the power of Lagash waned at this point, and that other territories such as Umma ("Gishban") and Kish prevailed.

Enannatum II was the last member of the family of Ur-Nanshe. He was succeeded by a priest named Enentarzi.

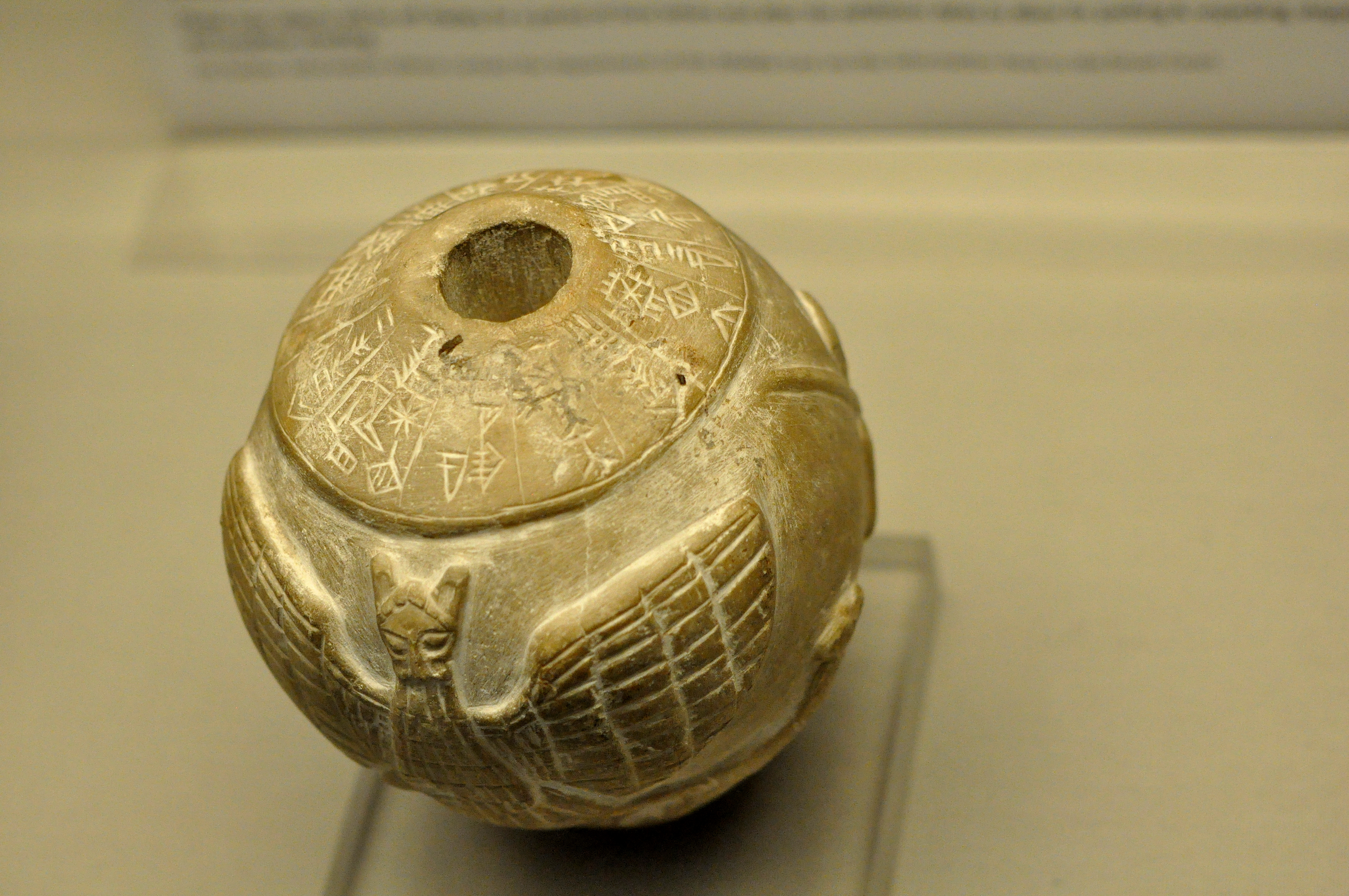
Inscription on the mace head, possibly dedicated to Enannatum II: "For Ningirsu of E-ninnu, the workman of Enannatum, ruler of Lagash, Barakisumun, the sukkal, dedicated this for the life of Enannatum, his Master."

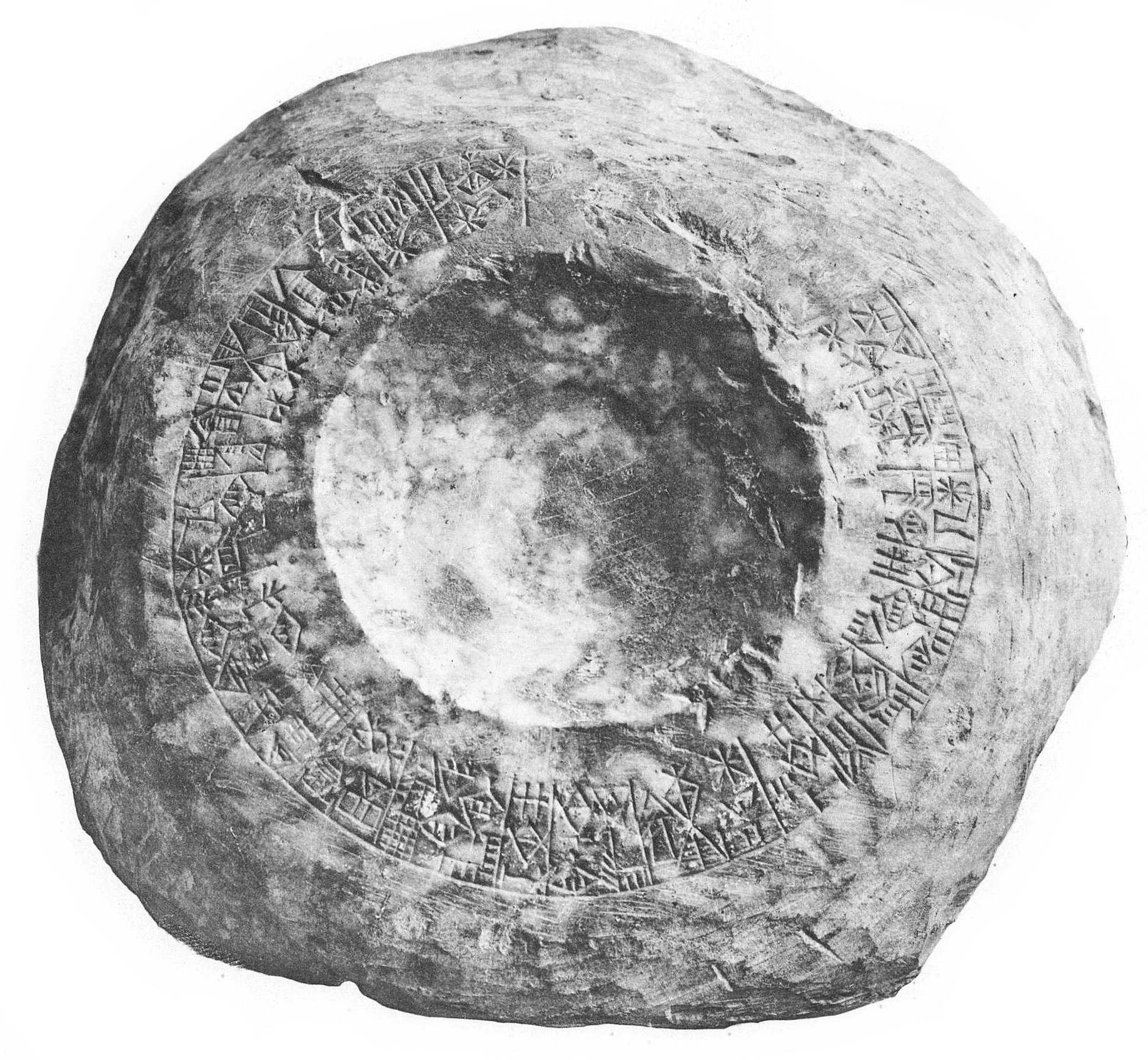
Door socket dedicated to Ningirsu by "Enannatum, ensi of Lagash (...) son of Entemena", hence Enannatum II, grandson of Enannatum I.

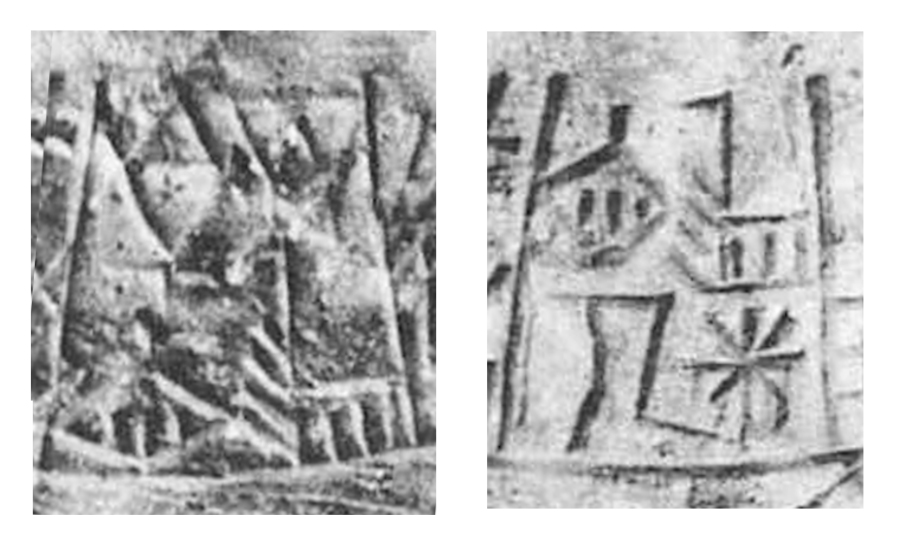
Inscriptions "Enannatum (...) son of Entemena" (𒂗𒀭𒈾𒁺...𒌉 𒂗𒋼𒈨𒈾) on the door socket.

== See also ==
Regnal titles
Preceded by Entemena	King of Lagash c. 2400 BC	Succeeded by Enentarzi
