= Lugalanda =

Sumerian king of Lagash, 24th century BC

Lugalanda 𒈗𒀭𒁕
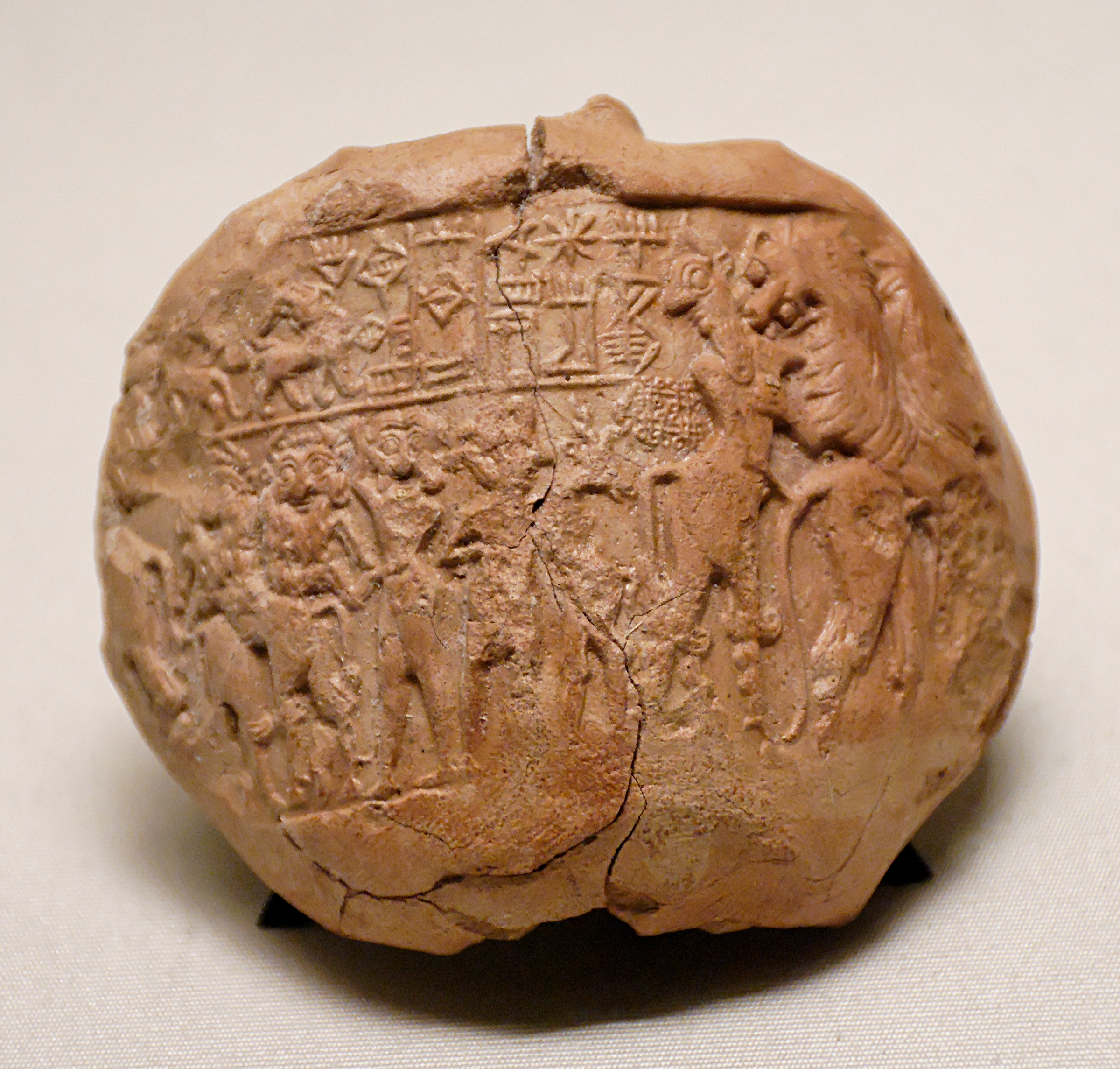
- Clay bulla impressed with the seal of Lugalanda, one of the last kings of the Ist Dynasty of Lagash. Early Dynastic III (c. 2400 BC). Found in Telloh (ancient Girsu).

King of Lagash
- Reign: c. 2384 - c. 2378 BC
- Predecessor: Enlitarzi or Enentarzi
- Successor: Urukagina
- Died: c. 2375 BC
- Spouse: Baranamtarra
- Dynasty: 1st Dynasty of Lagash
- Father: Enentarzi
- Religion: Sumerian religion

Location of Lagash

Lugalanda, also Lugal-anda (Sumerian: 𒈗𒀭𒁕; died c. 2375 BC) was a Sumerian king of Lagash. He was the son of Enentarzi, the high priest of Lagash, who appointed him as king. In ancient literature, he is notorious for being corrupt.

== Reign ==
The high priests of Lagash were very influential and either occupied the throne or decided who should. Priests, especially the high priests, remained very influential during Lugalanda's reign.

Lugalanda was married to Baranamtarra, the daughter of a great landowner who had commercial connections with the queen of Adab.

=== Corruption ===
All documents mentioning the reign of Lugalanda describe him as a wealthy and corrupt king. They state his reign was a time of great corruption and injustice against the weak. Inscriptions state that the king confiscated approximately 650 Morgen (around 6.5 sq km) of land.

An artifact detailing his reign reads:

The sealings of Lugal-anda and his wife—Break in traditions inaugurated by Urukagina—Causes of an increase in officialdom and oppression—The privileges of the city-god usurped by the patesi and his palace—Tax-gatherers and inspectors "down to the sea"—Misappropriation of sacred lands and temple-property, and corruption of the priesthood.

The writing purports that Lugalanda appointed officials unjustly, widely overtaxed civilians and misused properties all for the sake of his personal gain.

=== Overthrow ===
Around 2378 BC, Lugalanda was overthrown by Urukagina. During his reign, he attempted to root out the corruption in the government. Lugalanda's reign lasted 6 years and 1 month.

== Seals ==
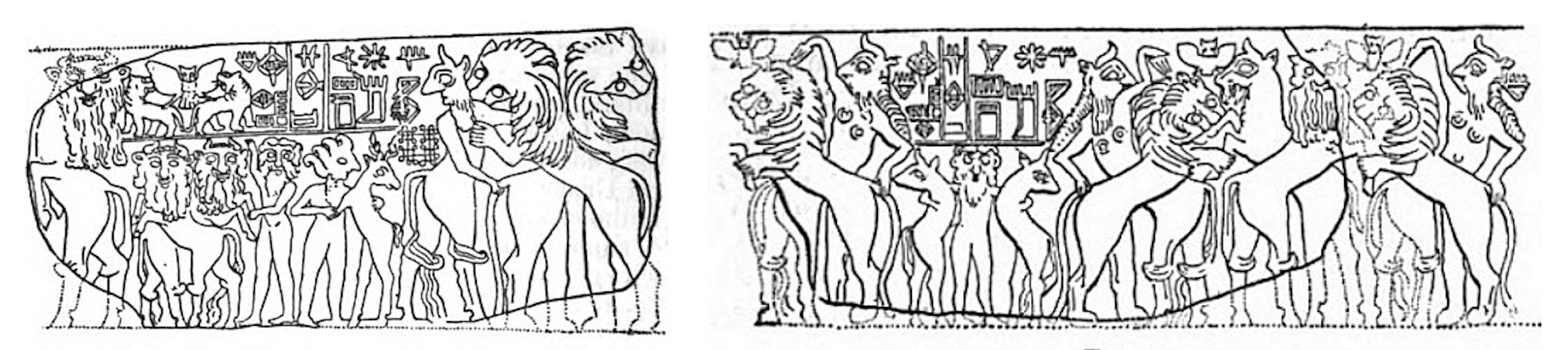
Seals of Lugalanda

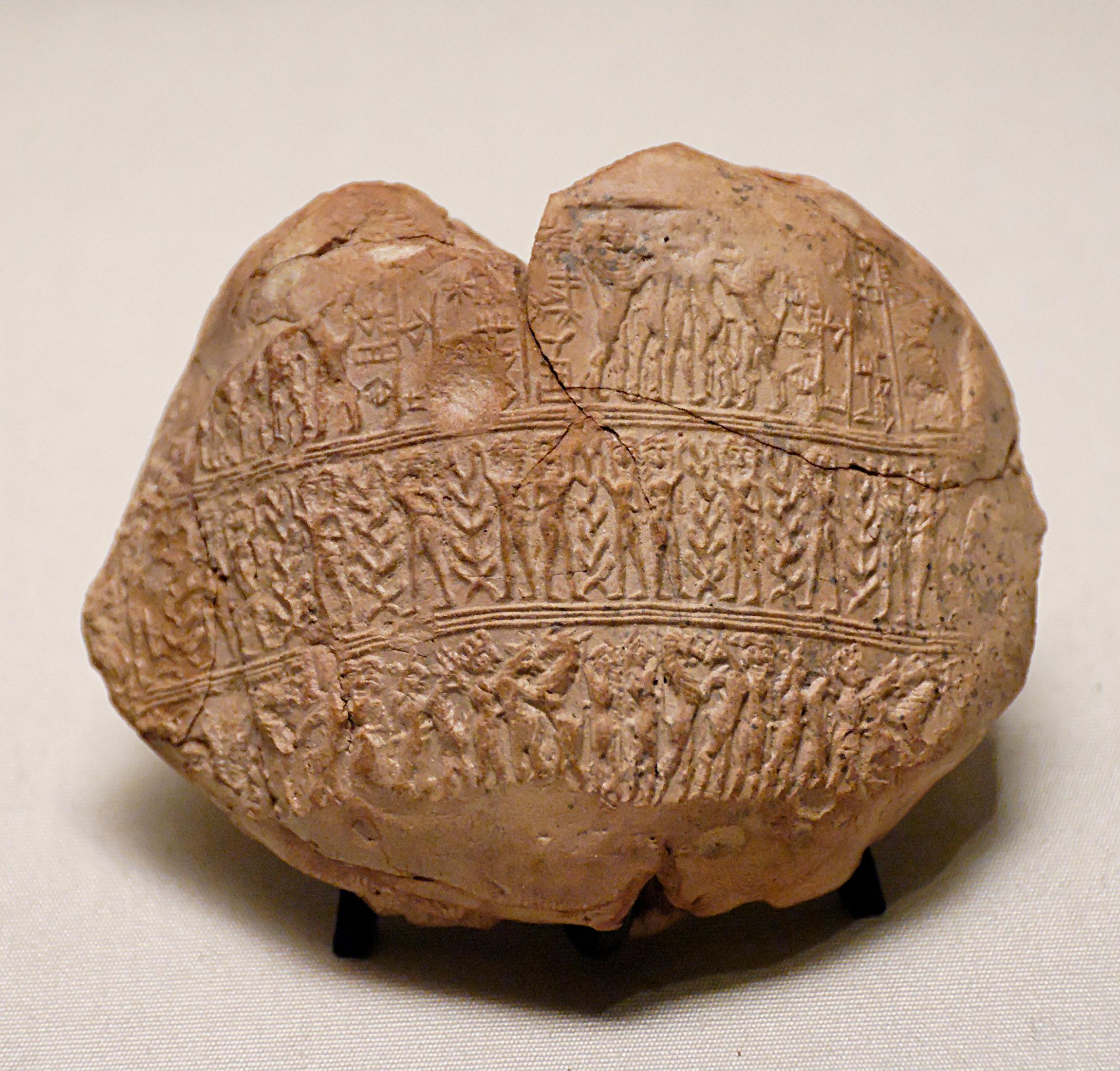
Seal of Barnamtarra, wife of Lugalanda. Clay seal impression.

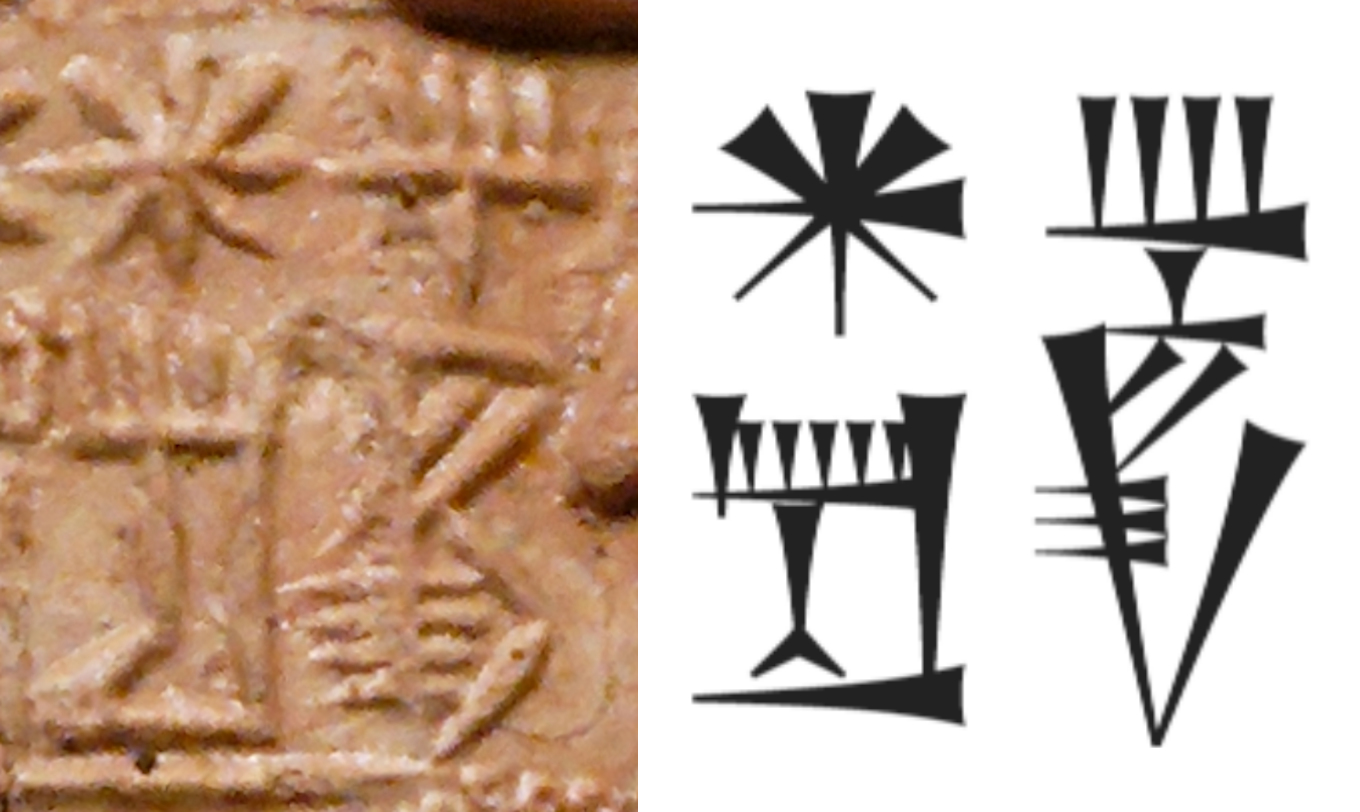
Cuneiform for the name "Lugal-anda"

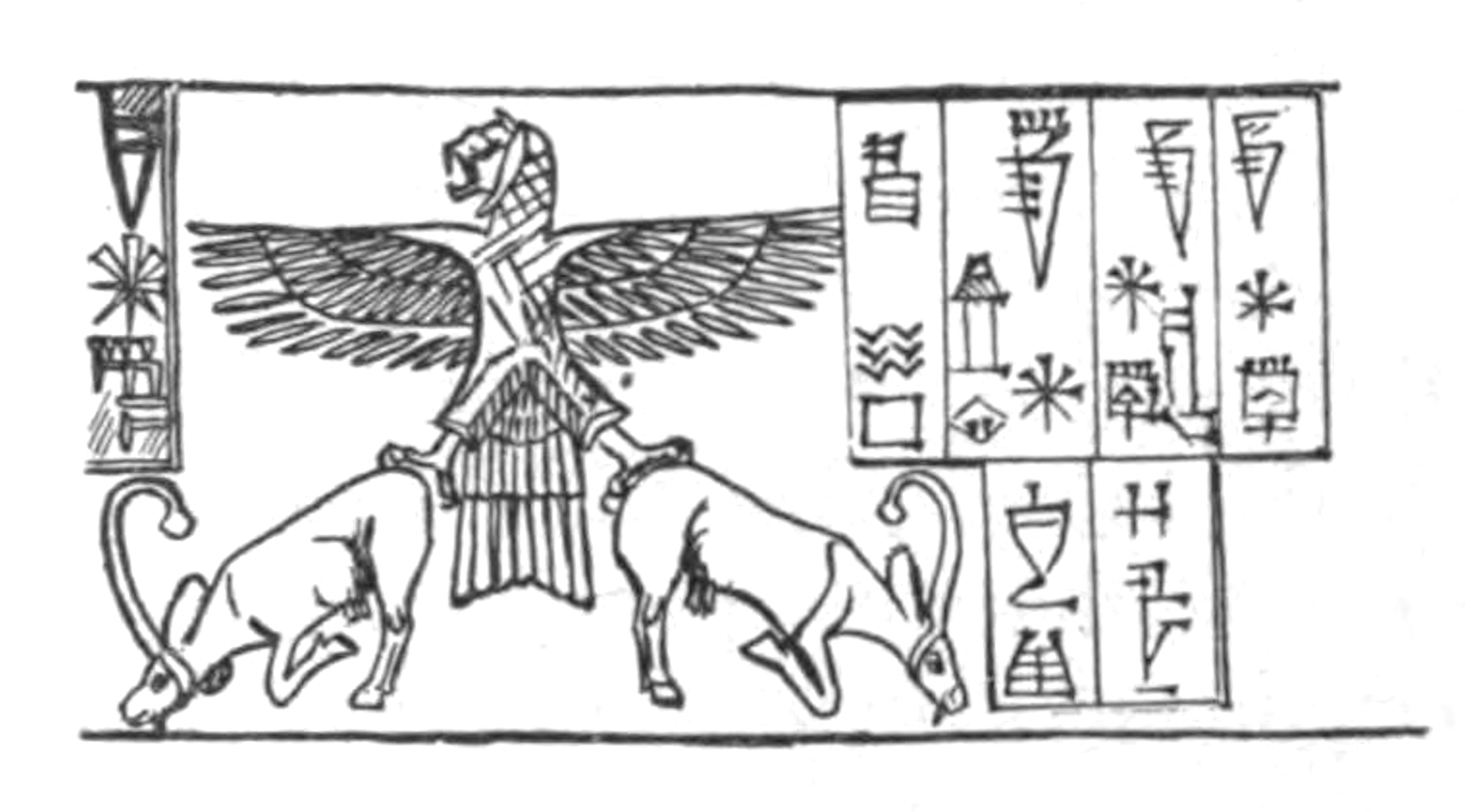
Seal in the name of Lugalanda

== Sources ==
- The original text comes from German Wikipedia. It cites Helmut Uhlig: Die Sumerer. Lübbe, Bergisch-Gladbach 1992, S. 208 ff., 211. ISBN 3-404-64117-5. (German)

Regnal titles
Preceded by Enlitarzi or Enentarzi	King of Lagash c. 2384 - c. 2378 BC	Succeeded by Urukagina
