= Enentarzi =

Enentarzi 𒂗𒂊𒋻𒍣
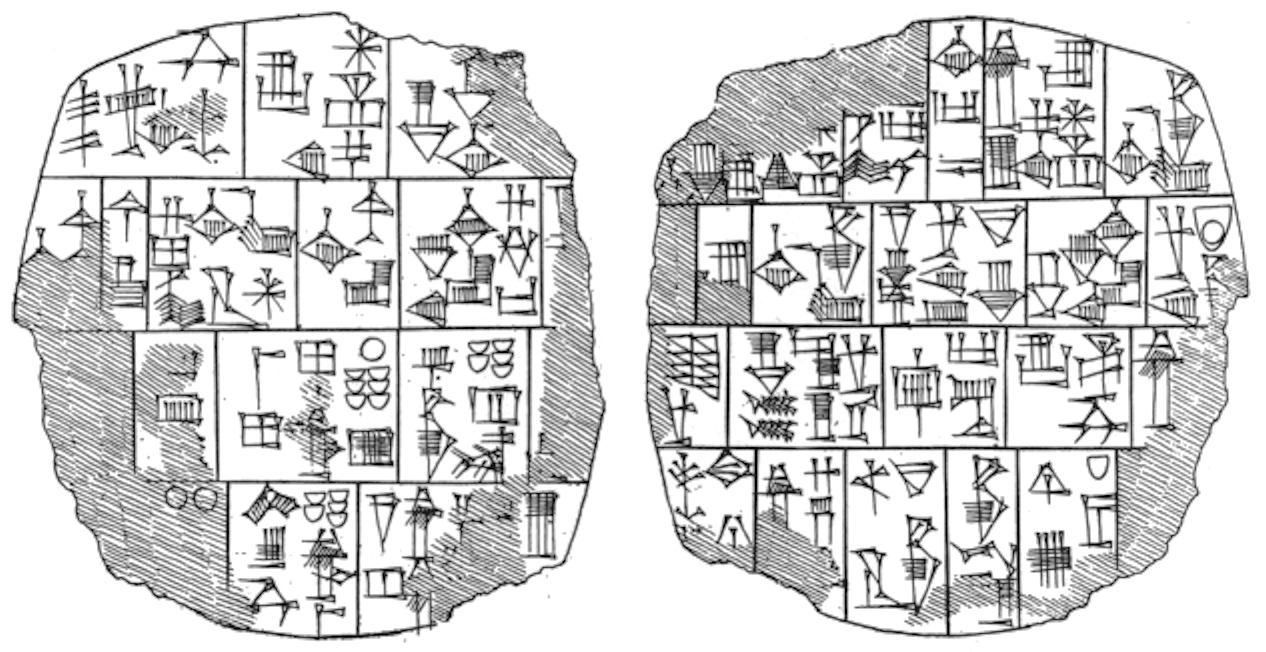
- Report to Enentarzi of the defeat of 600 Elamites who came to plunder Lagash

King of Lagash
- Reign: c. 2400 - c. 2384 BC
- Predecessor: Enannatum II
- Successor: Enlitarzi or Lugalanda
- Died: c. 2384 BC
- Issue: Lugalanda
- Dynasty: 1st Dynasty of Lagash

Location of Lagash

Enentarzi (𒂗𒇷𒋻𒍣, en-en₃-tar-zid, also 𒂗𒂊𒋻𒍣, en-e-tar-zi; died c. 2384 BC) was Ensi (governor) of Lagash. He was originally a chief-priest of Lagash for the god Ningirsu.

He succeed Enannatum II who only had a short reign and was the last representative of the house of Ur-Nanshe. It seems that the power of Lagash waned at this point, and that other territories such as Umma ("Gishban") and Kish prevailed.

Enentarzi probably ruled for at least 4 years.

An inscription records that 600 Elamites came to plunder Lagash during the rule of Enentarzi, but that they were repelled.

He was succeeded by either a priest named Enlitarzi, or his son Lugalanda.

Regnal titles
Preceded by Enannatum II	King of Lagash c. 2400 - c. 2384 BC	Succeeded by Enlitarzi or Lugalanda
