= Umma–Lagash war =

Earliest well-documented interstate war

Lagash-Umma border conflict
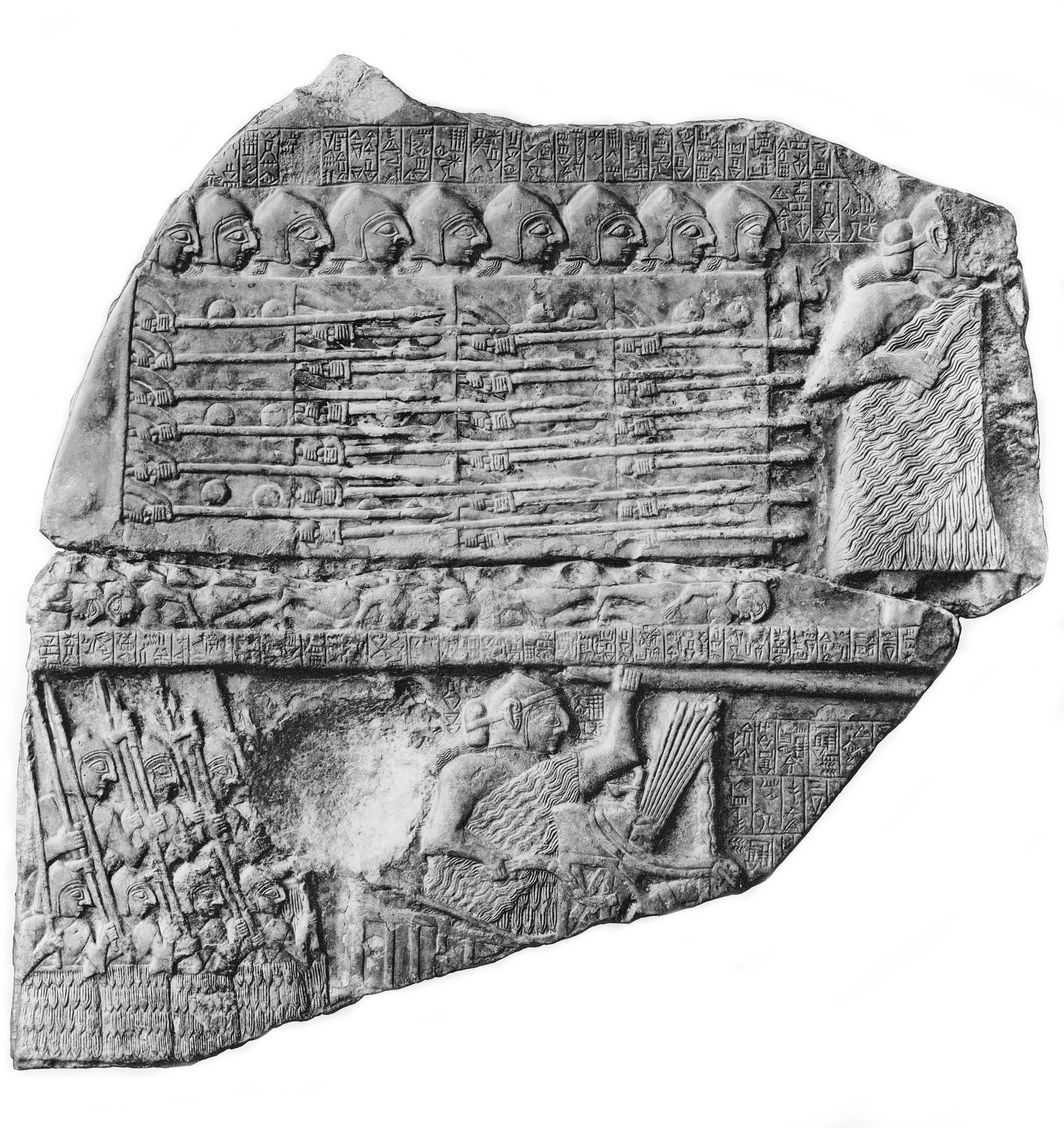
- The Stele of the Vultures, which documents key parts of the war.
Date	c. 26th century – c. 24th century BCE
Location	Sumer
Result	Victory of Umma

Belligerents
Umma	Lagash

Commanders and leaders
Ush; Enakalle; Ur-Lumma; Il, king of Umma; Lugalzagesi	Ur-Nanshe; Akurgal; Eannatum; Enanatum I Enmetena; Urukagina

The Umma–Lagash border conflict is the earliest well-documented case of a war between states. It took place in Sumer during the Early Dynastic III period (2600–2350 BCE), a period characterized by the division of the region into numerous city-states. The war is documented mainly by inscriptions from the city-state of Lagash, describing how Umma allegedly infringed on an old border treaty regarding a fertile piece of land coveted by both states. The intermittent conflict between the two polities lasted for generations.

The reigns of Eannatum and Enmetena saw several victories of Lagash, while Umma prevailed over its neighbour under the leadership of Lugalzagesi, who later ruled Uruk. Lugalzagesi's military offensives against Lagash led to the fall of the city, and Urukagina (ruler of Lagash) only retained control of a reduced territory centered on Ĝirsu. Lugalzagesi claimed control over all of Sumer and adopted the title "king of the land." His victory was contextualized by the emergence of new traditions of kingship and ideas about the political unification of the region. Lugalzagesi was himself defeated by Sargon of Akkad, who conquered all of Sumer and integrated it as part of his own kingdom, proclaiming the city of Akkad as its central point.

== Origins of the Conflict ==
The border conflict between Lagash and Umma is merely one example of local rivalry in Early Dynastic III Southern Mesopotamia. During this period, the region was characterized by dense, rapid urbanization and the competition between neighbouring polities for fertile land and water.

The conflict centered on a contested strip of agricultural land, the Gu'edena ("The Edge of the Plains"). Since most textual sources about this conflict come from Lagash, that bias makes it difficult to determine the ultimate cause of the war. The feud was already active during the reign of Mesilim, King of Kish, who acted as an arbiter and demarcated a border between the two polities. The relations between Umma and Lagash remained tense, however, and fighting would erupt multiple times over the following generations.

The sources that document the conflict are royal inscriptions written in Sumerian in clay and stone. The uses of these sources were varied, including: public display on monuments; commemorating the construction of foundations or the walls of the buildings; and inscription on votive objects intended for deities. Some of the tablets have obscure origins, perhaps due to the archaeological techniques used at the time of their unearthing. In the absence of more evidence from outside of Lagash, they allow for a reconstruction of the Lagashite historical tradition surrounding the conflict.

== Background ==
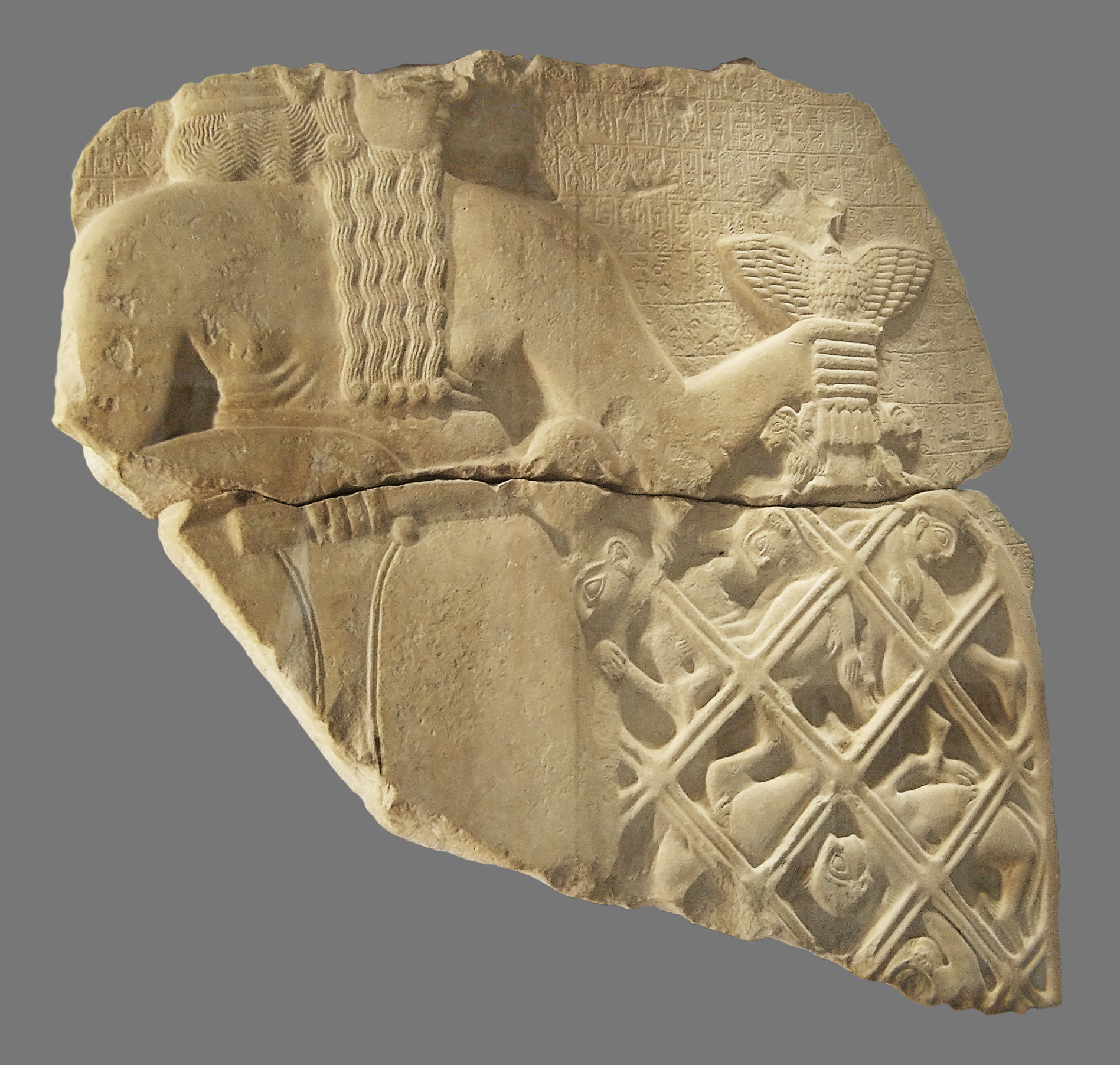
Fragment of the Stele of Vultures showing Ninĝirsu, the chief god of the state of Lagash, with captive Ummaites.

In Late Early Dynastic Sumer, most city-states were formed by the union of several previously independent cities, often of similar sizes. The state of Umma incorporated the urban centers at Tell Jokha, Umm al-Aqarib, and Tell Izbekh (Zabalam). Lagash was composed of Lagash proper (al-Hiba), the cities of Ĝirsu (Tello) and Niĝin (Tell Zurghul), as well as the seaport of Gu'abba. While Lagash was the name of the kingdom and this city was likely its original center, in the Early Dynastic IIIa the capital was Ĝirsu, and its tutelary god, Ninĝirsu, was the chief god of the local pantheon.

In the Sumerian city states, the land was conceptualized as the private property of the gods, and the ruler as the land's administrator. The border between Lagash and Umma was regarded as having a divine origin. The inscription on the Cone of Enmetena described how Enlil, the chief god of the Sumerian pantheon, had divided the land between the chief god of Lagash, Ninĝirsu, and the chief god of Umma, Shara. The gods were envisioned as active participants in the conflict. The Gue'dena was regarded by the rulers of Lagash as the property of Ninĝirsu, and the retrieval of the disputed territory was portrayed as a divine mission. Ninĝirsu was described by multiple inscriptions as intervening directly on the battlefield in the Lagashite rulers' favour.

== History ==
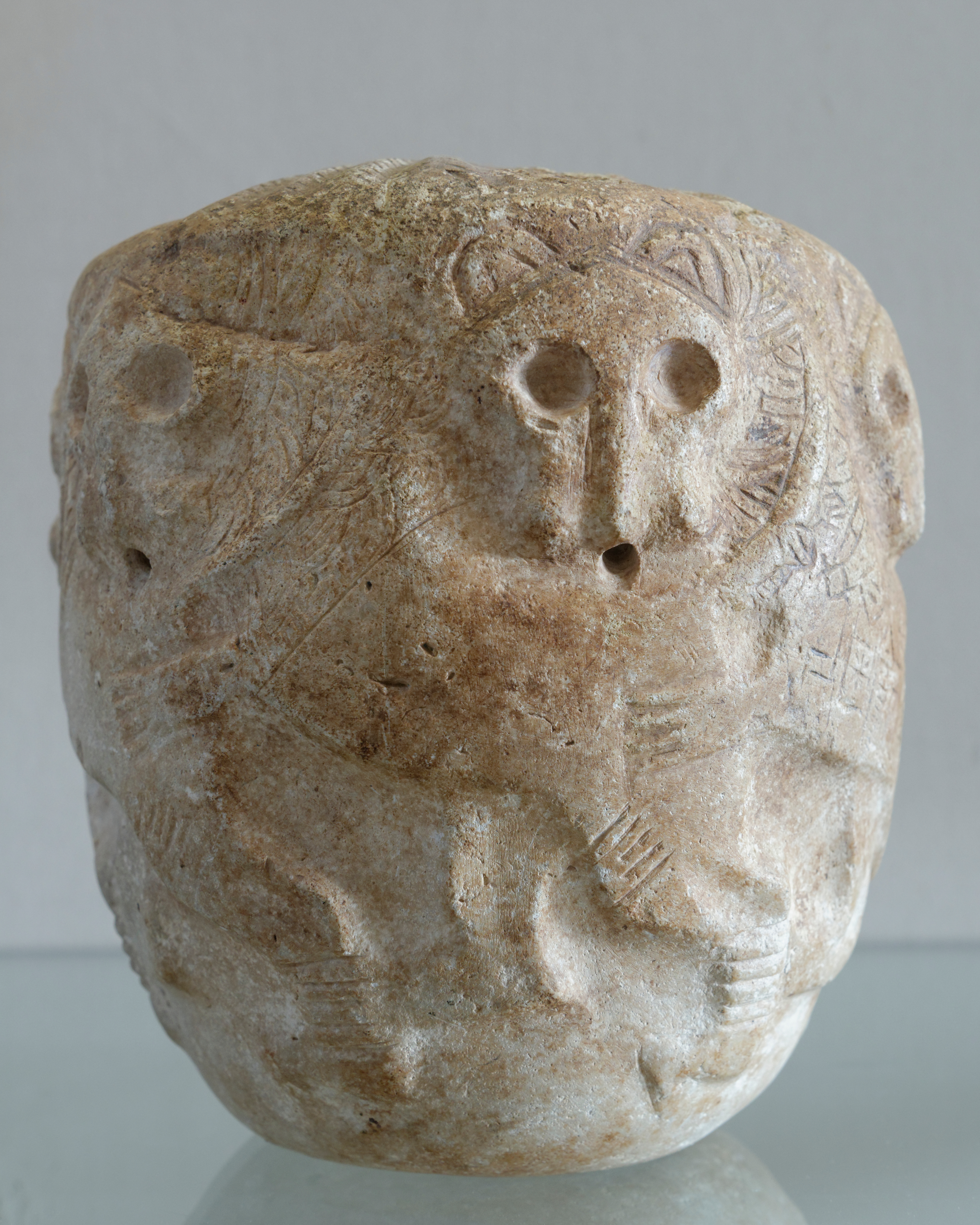
Votive mace-head of Mesilim, king of Kish, to the god Ninĝirsu.

=== Mediation of Mesilim and early attestations of conflict ===
The conflict might have already begun in the Early Dynastic III period. Mesilim, a 26th century BCE king of Kish, demarcated the border between Lagash and Umma. In later Lagashite inscriptions, Mesilim's judgement is repeatedly mentioned in order to portray Umma as a trespasser. The inscription on a mace-head dedicated to Ninĝirsu by Mesilim names Lugal-shaengur as his contemporary and the ruler of Lagash.

Ur-Nanshe is likely the first ruler of Lagash for whom a substantial number of royal inscriptions were created. He reigned circa 2500-2450 BCE. His inscriptions record his victories in battle over the city-states of Umma and Ur, and the capture of the ruler of Umma, Pabilgagaltuku.

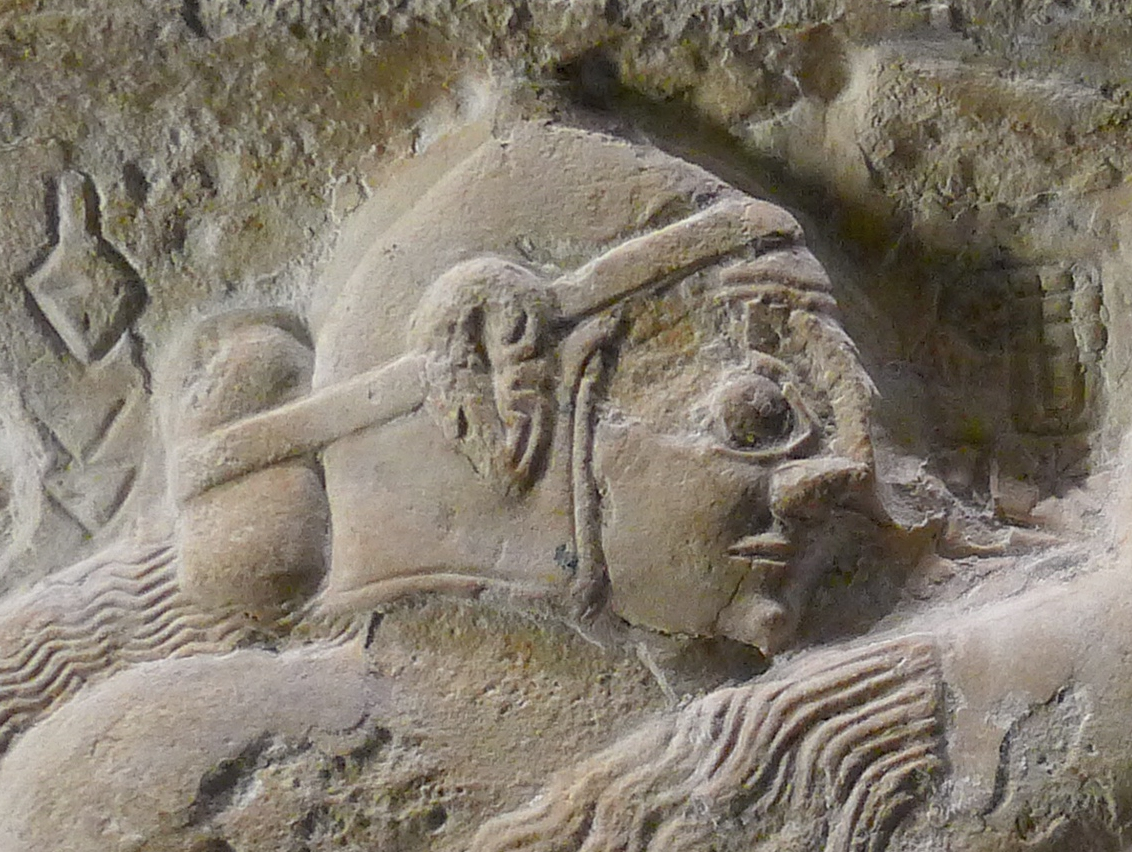
Eannatum, ruler of Lagash, detail of the Stele of Vultures.

=== Victories of Eannatum and Enmetena ===
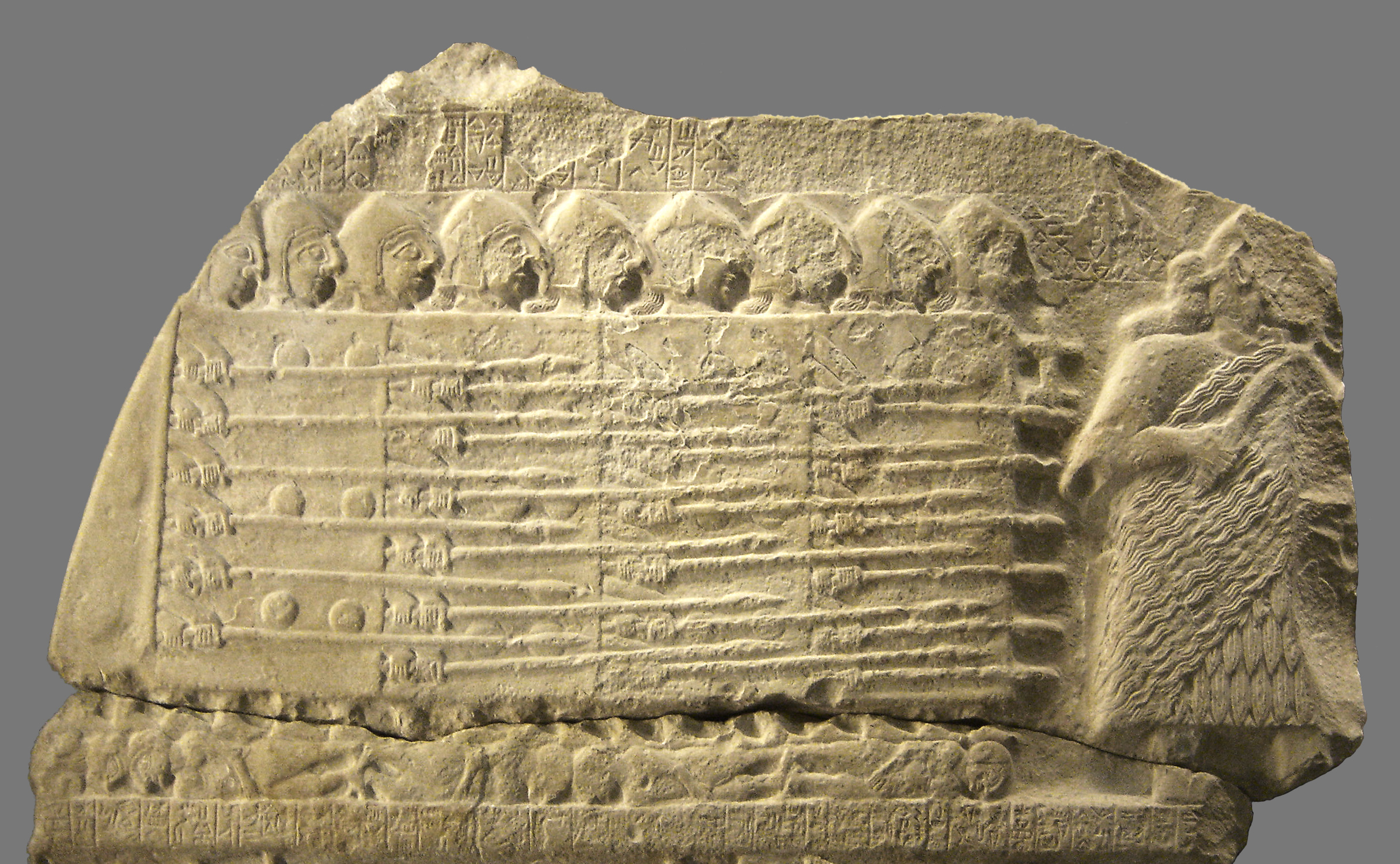
The army of Lagash, detail of the Stele of Vultures.

Ur-Nanshe was succeeded by his son Akurgal. Few inscriptions are known from his reign, which suggests he likely only ruled for a short time. The inscription on the victory stele of Akurgal's son Eannatum mentions the conflict between Akurgal and Umma over the Gu'edena. It is likely that Umma successfully occupied the Gu'edena, as the inscription also proclaims that Eannatum was created by Ninĝirsu to resolve the occupation of the god's property by Umma.

The inscriptions of Eannatum document his far-reaching military campaigns. A victory against Umma was recorded on a huge monument erected in the sacred city quarter of Ĝirsu, the partly preserved "Stele of the Vultures." The stele contains a fragmentary account of the border conflict from Lagash's point of view, mentioning the resistance of Eannatum's father, and perhaps grandfather, against an aggressive unnamed Umman ruler. In the inscription Eannatum claims that a ruler of Umma, only referred to as "the man of Umma," broke the border treaty established by Mesilim by invading and unlawfully seizing Lagashite territory, enraging Ninĝirsu. Ninĝirsu then created Eannatum to be his champion, gave him the kingship of Lagash and then sent him a dream promising him victory and the death of the ruler of Umma.

Umma suffered severe losses in the war against Eannatum, and the Umman ruler at the time was killed by his own people in the aftermath. In a treaty with his successor, Enakalle, Eannatum created a new boundary channel, left a strip of territory as a no-man's-land, and demanded that Umma pay him a loan in exchange for their exploitation of a portion of the Gu'edena.

Enakalle's forerunner was unnamed on the Stele of Vultures, but it has been suggested that he is the same person as Ush, a former ruler of Umma mentioned in an inscription about Eannatum's nephew Enmetena. It is unclear whether Ush was the same person as the successor of Pabilgagaltuku, the "man of Umma" who fought Eannatum's father and grandfather, and the adversary of Eannatum that was killed by his people–indeed, it is possible that these are three different individuals or the same person. Archaeologist Gebhard J. Selz points out that since it is possible to read the sign UŠ as nita, meaning "a male", this is possibly a pejorative reference to the ruler of Umma.

"[King Il of Umma] diverted water from the boundary channel of Ningirsu and the boundary channel of Nanshe (...). When because of those channels, Enmetena, the governor of Lagash, sent envoys to Il, Il, the governor of Umma, who steals fields (and) speaks evil, declared: 'The boundary channel of Ningirsu (and) the boundary channel of Nanshe is mine! I will shift the boundary levee from Antasura to Edimgalabzu!' But Enlil (and) Ninhursang did not give it to him."

— Inscription FAOS 5/1 Ent. 28/29 = RIME 1.9.5.1 iii 38-iv 10,

Eannatum was succeeded by his younger brother, Enannatum I. His reign saw the renewal of the conflict with Umma under its new ruler, Ur-Lumma, Enakalle's son. Ur-Lumma refused to pay back the loan Umma owed Lagash for the exploitation of the Gu'edena. He incorporated the boundary channels as part of Umma's irrigation network, and launched an invasion of Lagash with the help of foreign mercenaries, claiming part of its territory as his own. Ur-Lumma fought against both Enanatum I and his son and successor, Enmetena, and was eventually defeated in battle. He abandoned his charioteers and fled to his capital city of Umma, where he was killed.

Enannatum I was succeeded by his son Enmetena, whose rule saw great territorial expansions. His inscription on the Cone of Enmetena makes up the most complete extant account of the history of the border dispute. He takes credit for the final victory over Ur-Lumma, but does not mention the result of his father's struggle against the ruler of Umma. Historian Jerrold S. Cooper notes that the circumstances of Ur-Lumma's death are only mentioned in the inscription of Enmetena, while Enannatum I did not report them, despite describing Ur-Lumma's original transgression. He argues, therefore, that Enannatum I was likely seriously or mortally wounded during the decisive battle with the Ummaite ruler, and that Enmetena had to finish the fight by himself.

Ur-Lumma was succeeded as ruler of Umma by his nephew King Il. Like his uncle, Il diverted the water of the boundary channels for Umma's benefit, refusing to pay what was owed to Lagash for their use. The circumstances of the resolution of his conflict with Enmetena are unclear. The Enmetena inscriptions state that the gods thwarted Il's designs, perhaps indicating that II backed away without a military confrontation.

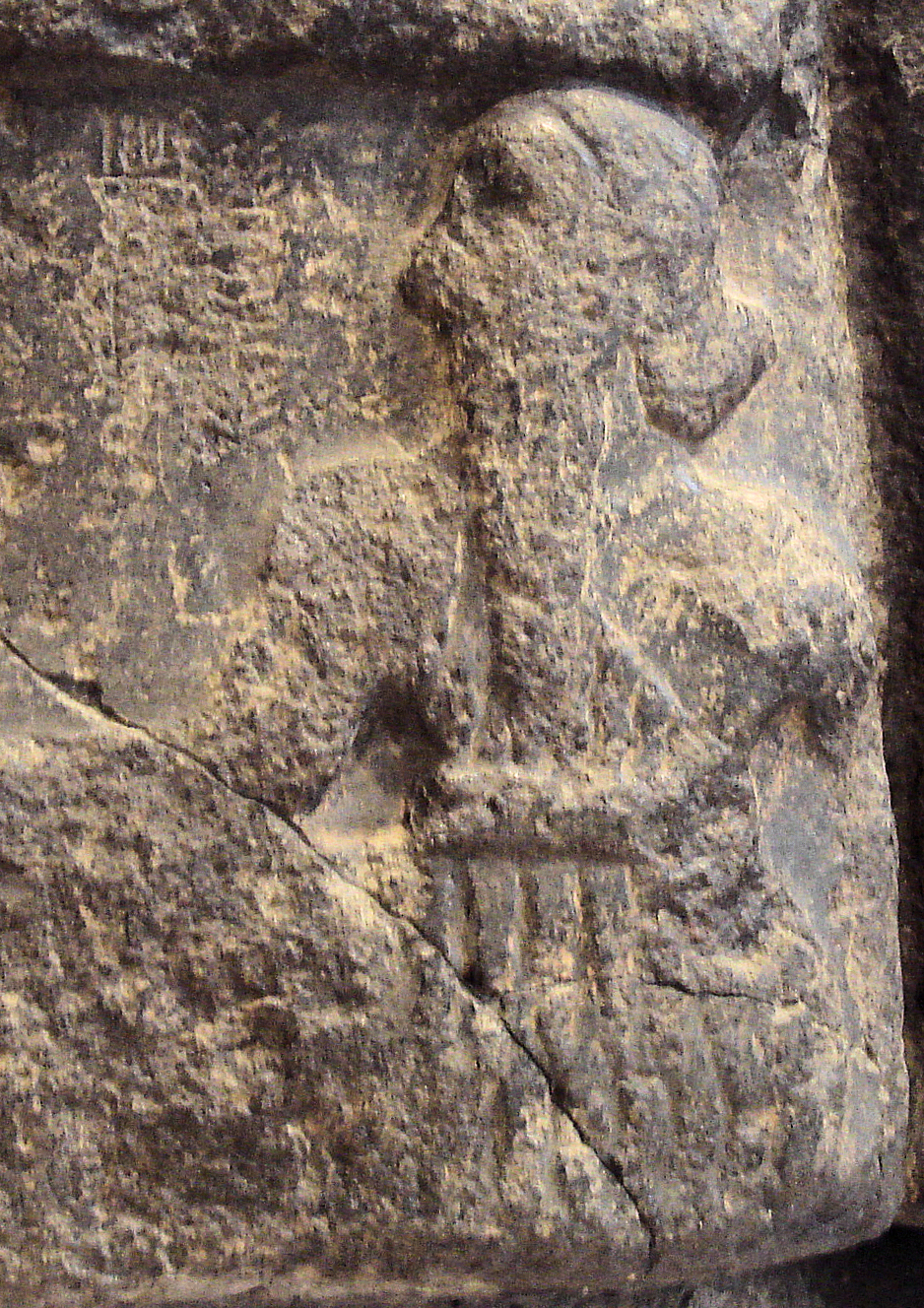
Sargon of Akkad on his victory stele.

=== Victory of Umma under Lugalzagesi and rise of Sargon of Akkad ===
There is very little information on the interstate relations between Lagash and Umma from the successors of Enmetena and Il up until the last pre-Sargonic ruler of Lagash, Urukagina. The ruler of Umma, Lugalzagesi, attacked the state of Lagash, which led to the fall of the city of Lagash itself. Urukagina was left in control of a reduced territory centered on the city of Ĝirsu. This is attested by the changing of his title from the traditional "ruler of Lagash" to "ruler of Ĝirsu" in his inscriptions. A unique clay tablet from Ĝirsu describes Lugalzagesi's sacking of Lagashite sanctuaries and temples during the invasion. Several of his inscriptions testify to a new decree of the Lagash-Umma boundary that he set up during his reign.

Lugalzagesi claimed control over all of Sumer, as attested by his adoption of the title "King of the land" or lugal kalama. His efforts to unify the region were the culmination of a new ideological and political project that had developed in the late Early Dynastic Period, characterized by the aspirations of certain rulers to forge and organize larger polities. This trend differed from the earlier prevailing conception of power, which had been tied to independent city-states and focused on local affairs.

Lugalzagesi's success would be short-lived, however. He was eventually defeated by another rising dynast, Sargon of Akkad, who integrated Lugalzagesi's former kingdom as part of his own burgeoning conquest. Akkad has often been called the world's first empire. Sargon's conquest of Sumer would mark a temporary halt in the independence of the kingdoms of Lagash and Umma, as they were integrated as provinces of the Akkadian kingdom.

== See also ==
- Mari–Ebla war
- Conquests of Sargon of Akkad
- List of conflicts in Iraq
