= Gishakidu =

Gishakidu 𒄑𒊮𒆠𒄭
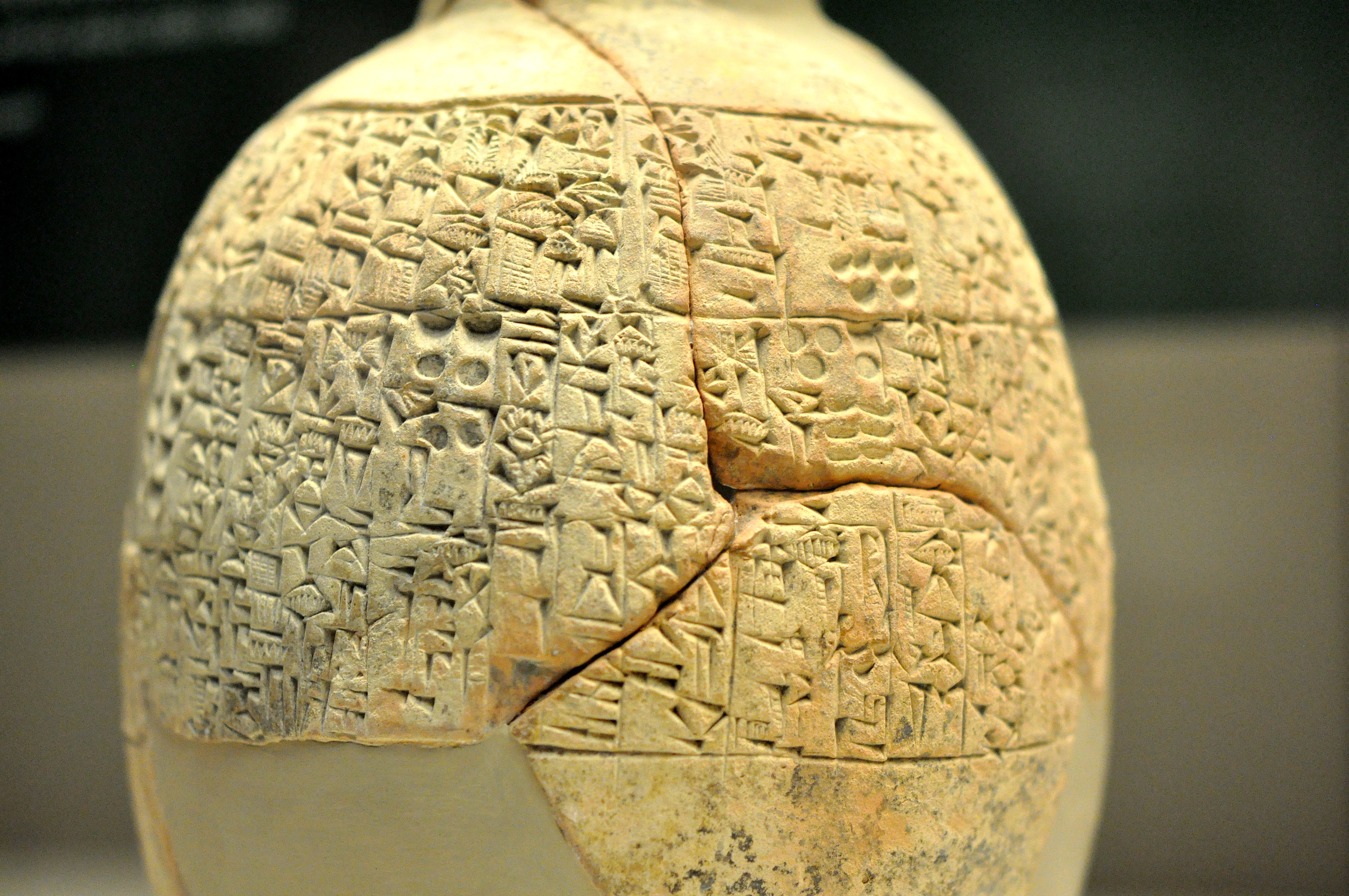
- Mace of King Gishakidu giving the city of Umma's account of its long-running border dispute with Lagash. The vase redefines the frontier by recording the locations of stelae to the god Shara, as well as the distances between them. c. 2400 BC. From Umma, Iraq. Ref. 140889, British Museum, London. Authorship lost, pre-Lugalzagesi Ummaite prince, could also be Il, king of Umma, but now generally attributed to Gishakidu.

King of Umma
- Reign: c. 2400 BC
- Predecessor: Il
- Successor: Possibly Ukush
- Spouse: Bara-irnun
- Dynasty: 1st Dynasty of Umma
- Father: Il

Location of Umma

Gishakidu (𒄑𒊮𒆠𒄭 giš-ša_{3}-ki-du_{10};fl. c. 2400 BC) was king of the Sumerian city-state of Umma and husband of queen Bara-irnun. He was the son of Il, and his reign lasted at least 4 years. He is particularly known from a gold votive plate (AO 19225) by his queen, in which she describes her genealogy in great detail. The inscription on the plate reads:

For (the god) Shara, lord of the E-mah: when Bara-irnun - wife of Gishakidu, king of Umma, daughter of Ur-Lumma, king of Umma, grand-daughter of Enakalle, king of Umma, daughter-in-law of Il, king of Umma - had made Shara resplendent and had built him a holy throne, for her life, to Shara, in the E-Mah, she offered (this ornament)."

— Inscription of Bara-Irnum

The original royal line of Umma consisted in the filiation of Enakalle (possibly son of Ush) and his own son Ur-Lumma. When Ur-Lumma died, presumably without a son but certainly with a daughter named Bara-irnum, the throne was handed over to Il, son of Eanandu (who had no regnal title) and grandson (or nephew) of Enakalle. King Il was then succeeded by his own son Gishakidu. Bara-irnum married her cousin Gishakidu, thus re-uniting both stands of the royal family by a marital alliance.

Gishakidu is also known from a dedicatory inscription on a cylinder:

When Shara spoke to Enlil, the prayers gathered in his heart, and when he approached him, Gishakidu, the beloved shepherd of Shara, the one born .... a warrior Prince, the fear-inspiring leader of Sumer, who has no rival in all the foreign lands, the en-priest attached to the side of Ninura, counseled by Enki as by his own mother, the beloved friend of Ishtaran, the mighty governor of Enlil, the king selected by Inanna, at that time he constructed this boundary dyke.

— Cylinder inscription of Gishakidu, MS 2426

A foundation inscription in his name is also known.

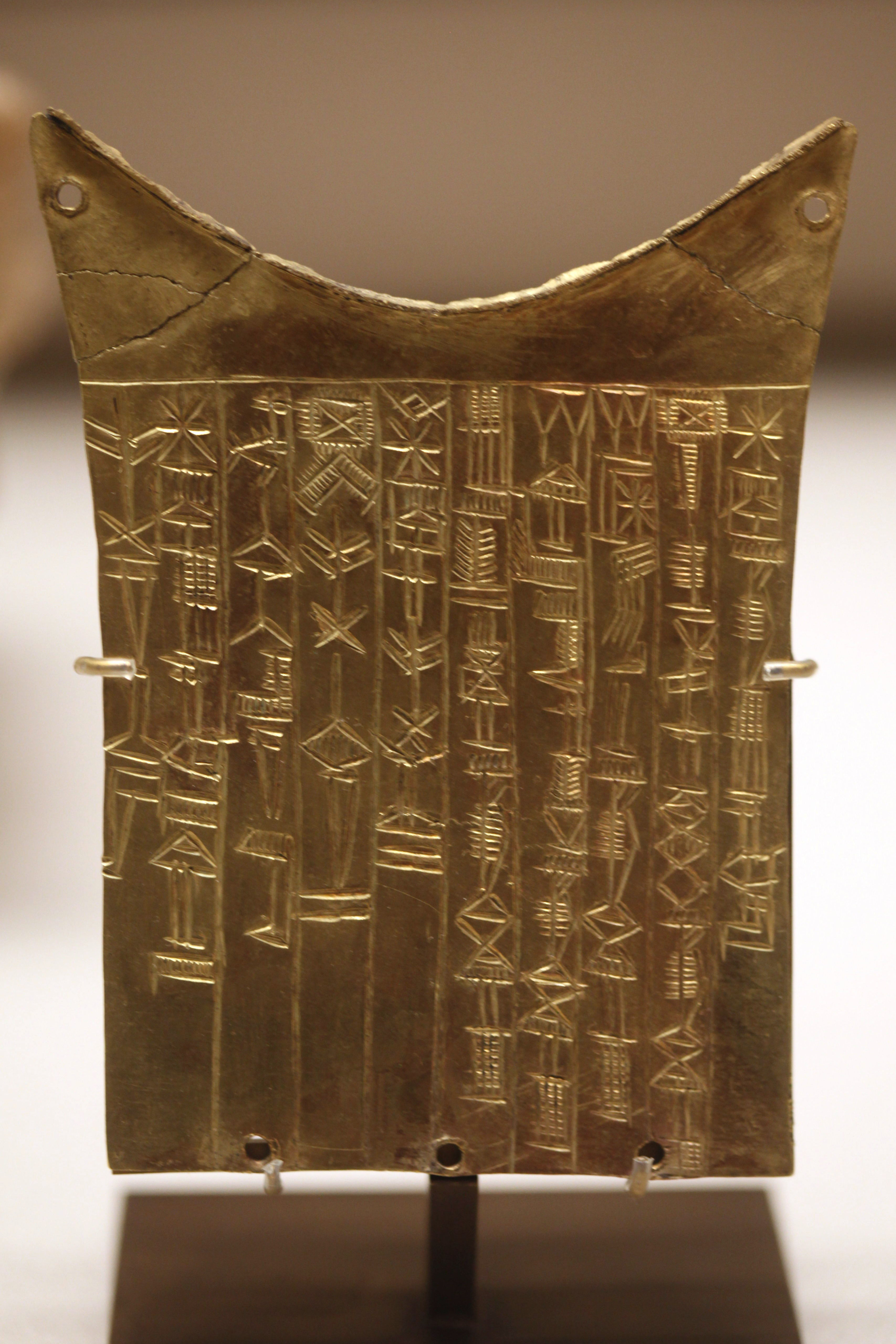
Votive plate of Queen Bara-irnun of Umma, "wife of Gishakidu, king of Umma, daughter of Ur-Lumma, king of Umma, grand-daughter of Enakalle, king of Umma, daughter-in-law of Il, king of Umma", to God Shara, in gratitude for sparing her life. Louvre Museum.

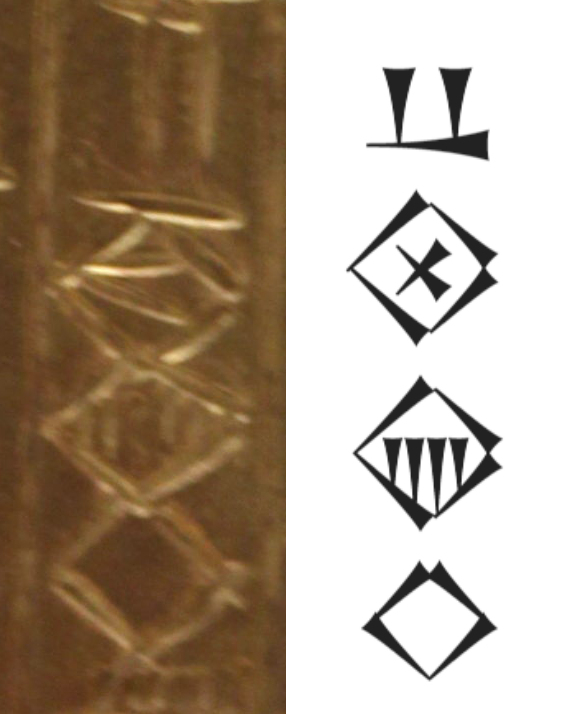
Name of Gishakidu on the plaque (second column), and standard Sumero-Akkadian cuneiform (𒄑𒊮𒆠𒄭 giš-ša_{10}-ki-du_{10})

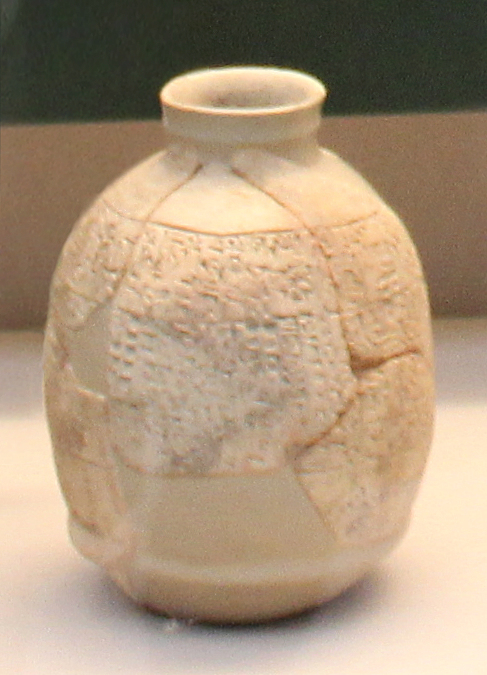
The Gishakidu macehead, British Museum
