= Ninura =

Mesopotamian goddess

- Tutelary goddess of Umma
- Major cult center: Umma, Gišaba
- Successor: Inanna of Zabalam
- Animals: lion, possibly swan or goose
- Temple: Eula

Genealogy
- Spouse: Shara

Ninura (^{d}Nin-ur_{4}(-ra); also romanized as Ninurra) was a Mesopotamian goddess associated with the state of Umma. The god Shara, worshiped in the same area, was regarded as her husband. She is only attested in sources from the third millennium BCE. Her cult started to decline in the Ur III period, and she no longer appears in Old Babylonian texts. Other goddesses replaced her in both of her major roles, with Inanna of Zabalam becoming the goddess of Umma, and Usaḫara or Kumulmul taking her place as Shara's spouse.

== Character ==
The meaning of Ninura's name is unknown, though it is agreed that neither of the two attested writings, older ^{d}nin-ur_{4} (𒀭𒊩𒌆𒌴) and newer ^{d}nin-ur_{4}-ra (𒀭𒊩𒌆𒌴𒊏), supports the view that it was a genitive construction. Manfred Krebernik and Jan Lisman suggest that in the light of wool production being a major industry at Umma, where Ninura was worshiped, the ur_{4} sign refers to the plucking of sheep in this context.

Ninura's best attested epithet is "mother of Umma", ama-tu-da Ĝišša^{ki}. The toponym Ĝišša is presumed to be an alternate name of Umma. However, it was originally a separate settlement corresponding to modern Umm al-ʿAqārib, which came to be abandoned by the end of the Early Dynastic period. The inhabitants presumably moved to nearby Umma (HI×DIŠ or UB.ME^{ki}, modern Tell Jokha), which might explain why ĜEŠ.KUŠU_{2}^{ki}, originally read as Ĝišša, came to function as a designation of Umma.

The god Shara was regarded as Ninura's husband, and they (or their temples) are commonly mentioned side by side. In the Zame Hymns, she precedes him. She is similarly placed before him in early offering lists, and it has been suggested that she might have been the original tutelary deity of Umma, only replaced by Shara in this role later on. Hartmut Waetzoldt notes that while this theory is plausible, in historical times Ninura had fewer temples in the area surrounding the city than Shara did.

The existence of an emblem (šu-nir) of Ninura is mentioned in texts from Umma. According to Julia M. Asher-Greve, seals from this city depicting a goddess accompanied by a lion are likely to be representations of her, as the animal was seemingly the city's emblem and appears both alongside inscriptions of members of upper classes of local society and as a symbol of Shara. It is also possible that analogously to spouses of a number of other city gods, for example Nanna's wife Ningal, she could be depicted in the company of birds presumed to be swans or geese, who might have functioned as a symbol of both love between the divine couples and of their protective qualities.

Aside from the Zame Hymns only a single literary text describes Ninura. An early UD.GAL.NUN source from Abu Salabikh describes her "making the heaven treamble" and "beating down the earth" to guarantee the city of IRI×A (reading uncertain) will submit to EN.MES, presumed to be a human hero.

== Worship ==
Ninura is only mentioned in sources from the third millennium BCE. The earliest attestations come from Early Dynastic Abu Salabikh, and include the Zame Hymns, a god list and a literary text. She was associated with Umma and territories surrounding it. One of its rulers, Gishakidu, referred to himself as an "en priest attached to the side of Ninura". Her temple located in this city bore the ceremonial name Eula, possibly "house of sleep". The name appears in an inscription of Nammaḫani, a local ruler contemporary with the period of Gutian rule in Mesopotamia, who rebuilt it. The position of "temple administrator" is only attested among the clergy of Ninura and Shara in texts from Umma. A gudu_{4} priest in her service is also attested. Furthermore, she had an 'egi-zi' priestess, associated with the settlement Gišaba. In early sources, theophoric names invoking Ninura were common in the state of Umma due to her status as a local deity, similarly to how Nanshe and Bau commonly appear in names from the state of Lagash. Examples include Ku-Ninura, Lu-Ninura, Lugal-Ninura, Ninura-amamu, Ninura-da and Ninura-kam. However, only a single seal with the formula "servant of Ninura" is known.

Ninura's importance in the Ur III period was comparatively minor, and only a few references to offerings made to her are known. The scope of her cult shrank, and she was only worshiped in Umma and its proximity, in settlements such as A.KA.SAL^{ki}, Anneĝar, DU_{6}-na and KI.AN.KI. However, administrative documents nonetheless indicate her temple was considered to be the second highest ranked house of worship in Umma itself. Preparation of bricks for the construction of temples of Ninura and Shara is mentioned on a tablet from the Yale Babylonian Collection presumed to originate in Umma, and might be related to Shu-Sin's building projects in the area, though according to Douglas Frayne the known copy is likely only a school exercise. It is also possible that a goddess depicted on the seal of Ninḫilia, the wife of Aakala, the governor of Umma during the reign of the same king, can be identified as Ninura.

No attestations of Ninura postdating the Ur III period are known. In the Old Babylonian period Inanna of Zabalam seemingly came to be seen as the tutelary goddess of Umma instead. In later sources, Ninura no longer appears as Shara's wife either, and he is instead accompanied by Usaḫara or Kumulmul, with both attested at once in the Old Babylonian forerunner to the later god list An = Anum.
