= Il, king of Umma =

Il 𒅍
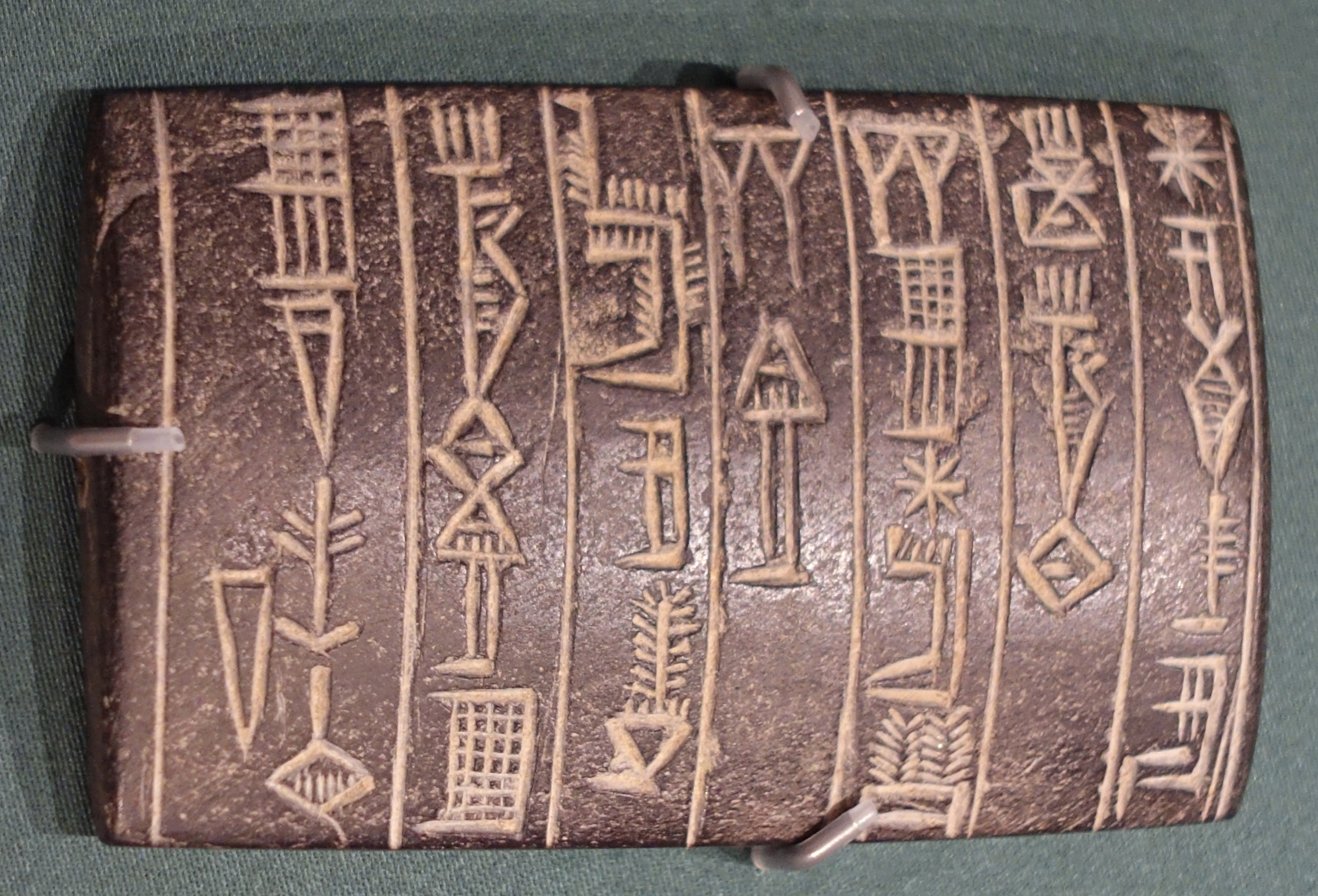
- Stone tablet for the dedication of a temple, inscribed by Il, king of Umma, c. 2400 BC, and mentioning his father Eandamu (𒂍𒀭𒁕𒊬), and his grandfather King Enakalle (𒂗𒀉𒆗𒇷). Oriental Institute Museum, University of Chicago.

King of Umma
- Reign: c. 2420 BC
- Predecessor: Ur-Lumma
- Successor: Gishakidu
- Issue: Gishakidu
- Dynasty: 1st Dynasty of Umma

Location of Umma

Il (Sumerian: 𒅍, IL) was king (𒈗, Lugal; fl. c. 2420 BC) of the Sumerian city-state of Umma. His father might have been Eandamu, and his grandfather was King Enakalle, who had been vanquished by Eannatum of Lagash. Il was the successor to Ur-Lumma. According to an inscription, before becoming king, he had been temple administrator in Zabalam: "At this time, Il, who was the temple administrator of Zabalam, marched in retreat from Girsu to Umma and took the governorship of Umma for himself." He ruled for at least 12 years.

An alabaster foundation tablet with unknown provenance reads (Uttu, goddess of weaving, has been suggested for TAG.NUN):

"For the deity TAG.NUN, Il, king of Umma, son of E-anda-mua, grandson of En-akale, king of Umma, built her temple for her."

He entered in a territorial conflict with Entemena, ruler of Lagash, as mentioned in an inscription:

"He (Il) diverted water from the boundary-channel of Ningirsu and the boundary-channel of Nanshe (...). When because of those channels, Enmetena, the governor of Lagash, sent envoys to Il, Il, the governor of Umma, who steals fields (and) speaks evil, declared: ‘The boundary-channel of Ningirsu (and) the boundary-channel of Nanshe are mine! I will shift the boundary-levee from Antasura to Edimgalabzu!’ But Enlil (and) Ninhursang did not give it to him."

Il was defeated by Entemena, who had sought the aid of Lugal-kinishe-dudu of Uruk, successor to Enshakushanna, who is in the king list.

Il later fought against Enannatum II, king of Lagash and successor to Enmetena, and defeated him, ending the Lagash dynasty founded by Ur-Nanshe.

He was succeeded by his son, Gishakidu.

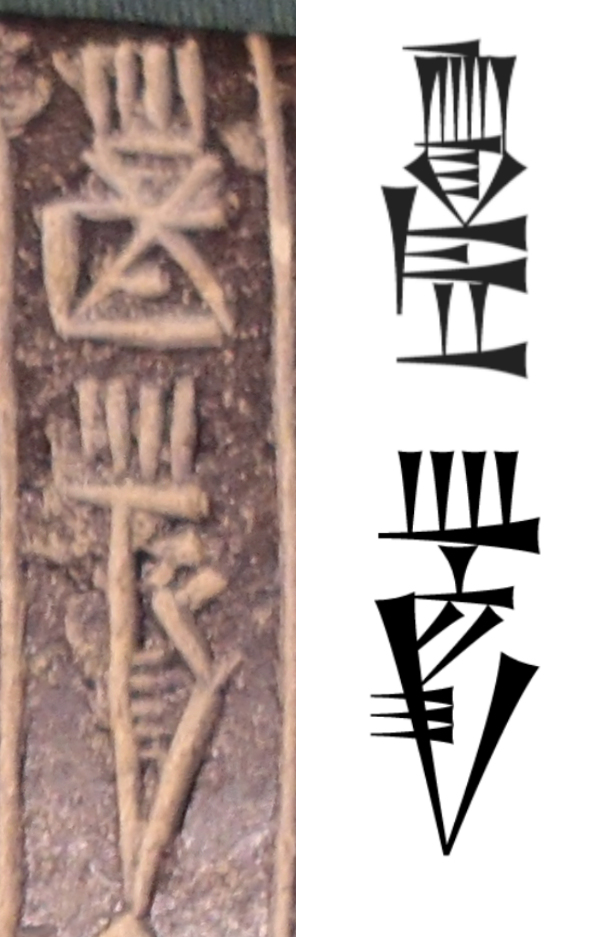
Name of "King Il" on his tablet (𒈗 being the character for Lugal, "King"), and corresponding standard Sumero-Akkadian cuneiform

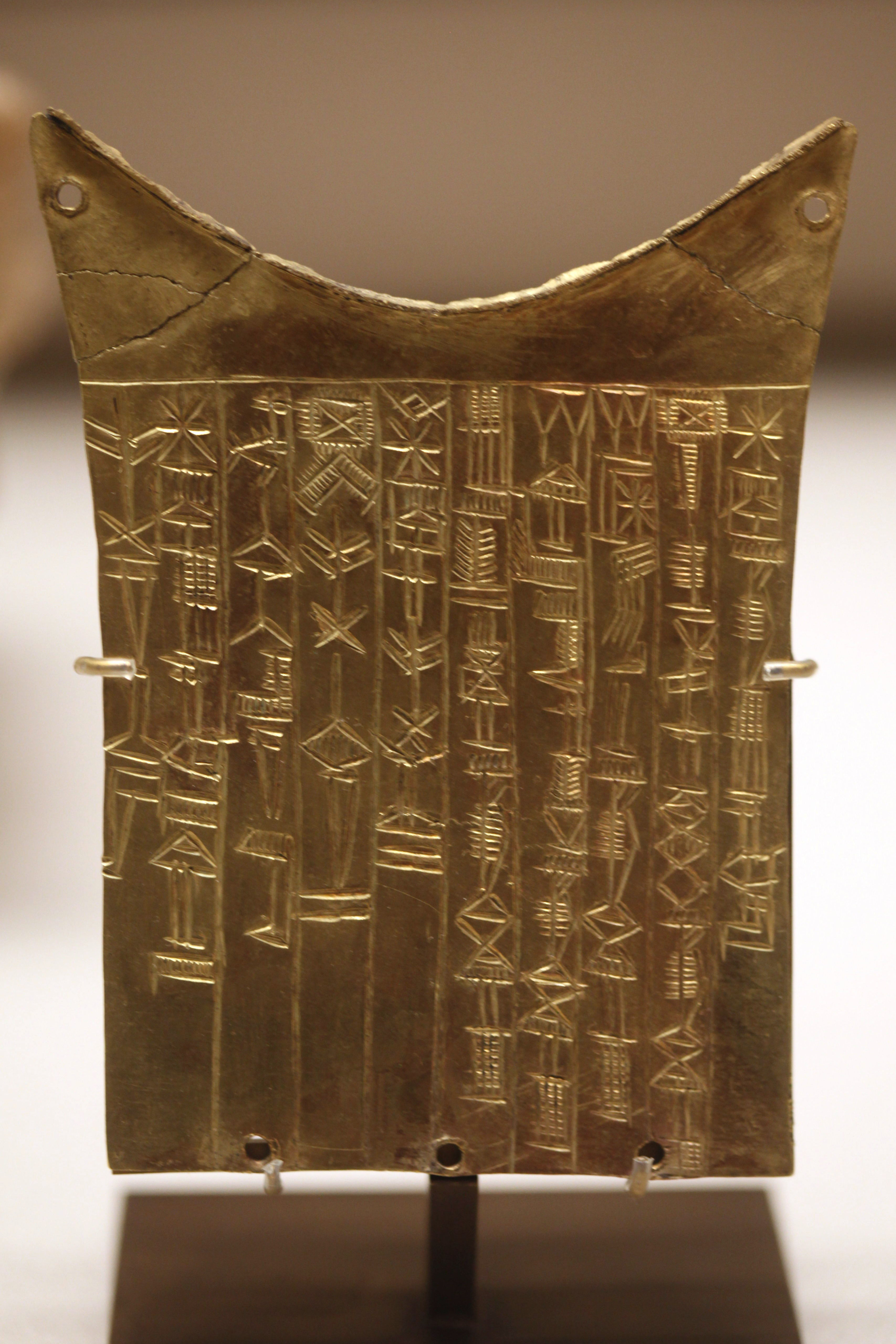
Votive plate of Queen Bara-irnum of Umma, "wife of Gishakidu, king of Umma, daughter of Ur-Lumma, king of Umma, grand-daughter of Enakalle, king of Umma, daughter-in-law of Il, king of Umma", to God Shara, in gratitude for sparing her life.

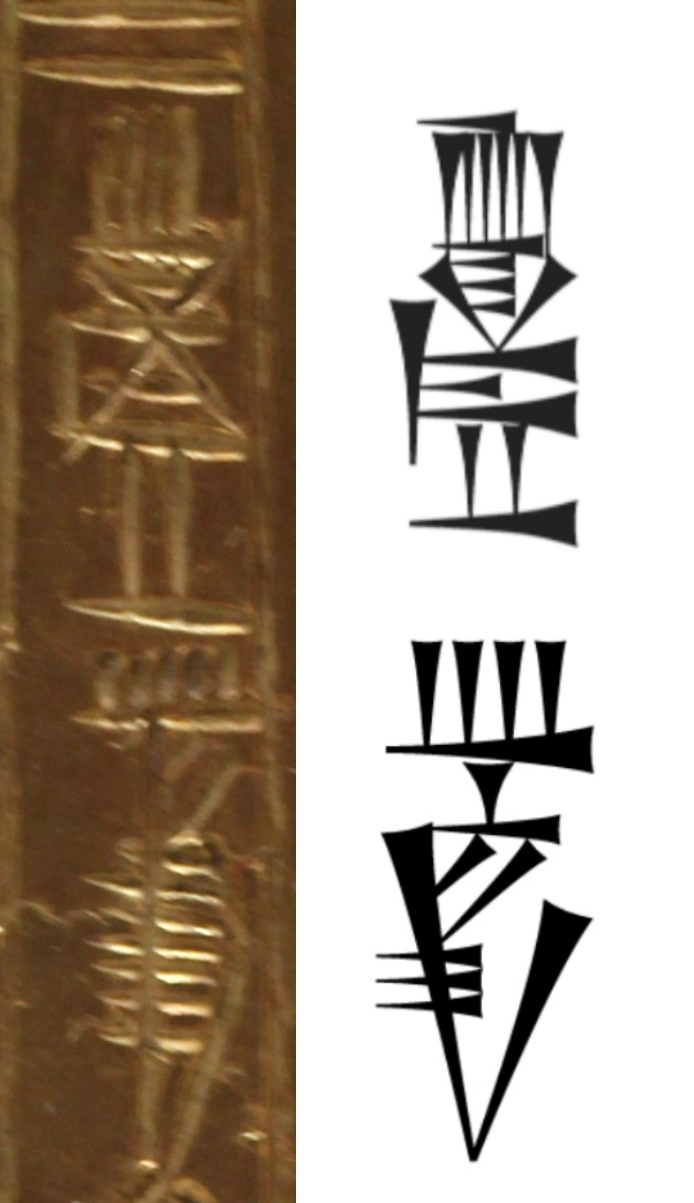
"King Il" (𒅍𒈗, Il lugal) on the votive plate of Queen Bara-irnun
