= Bara-irnun =

Bara-irnun 𒁈𒅕𒉣
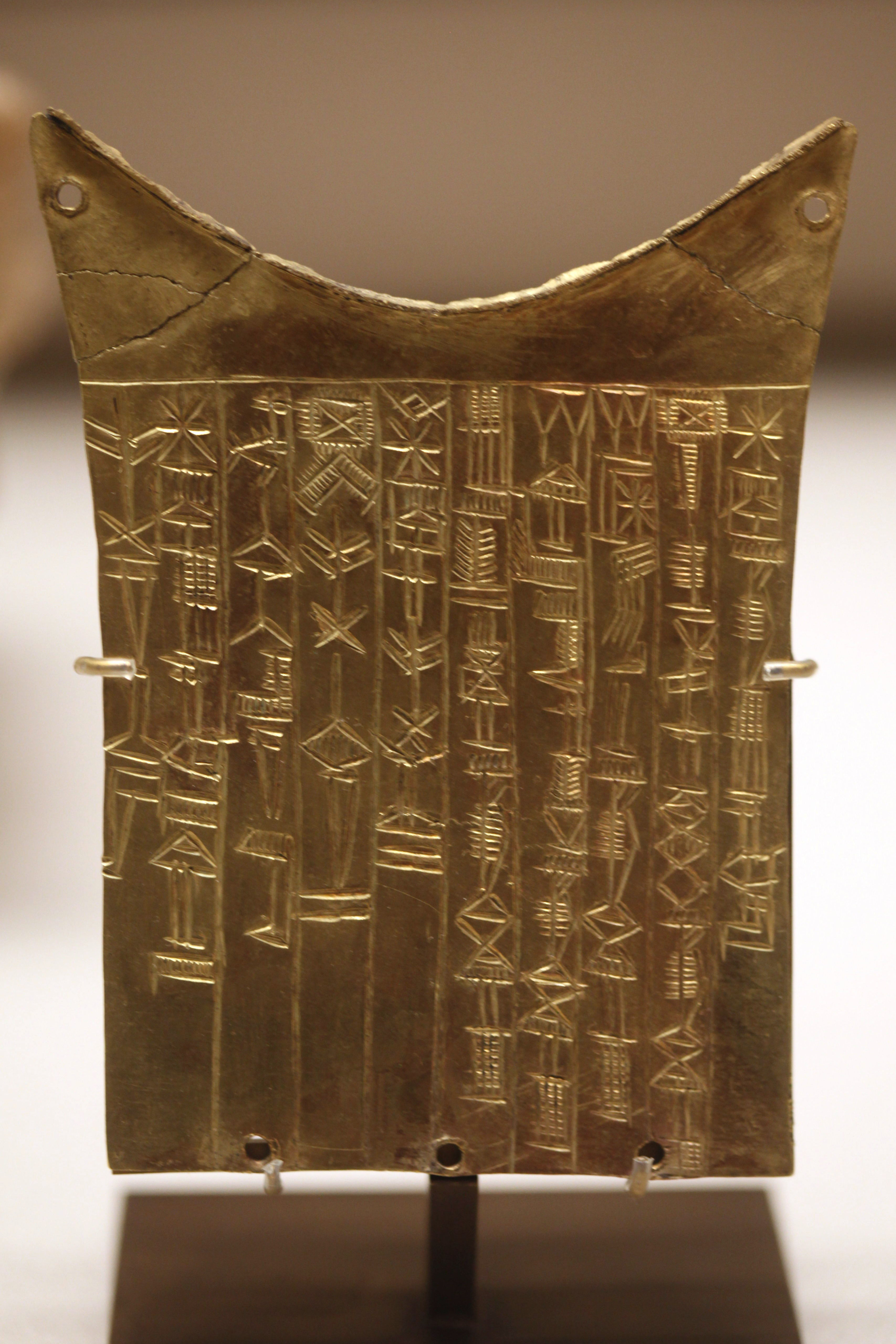
- Votive plate of Queen Bara-Irnun of Umma, "wife of Gishakidu, king of Umma, daughter of Ur-Lumma, king of Umma, grand-daughter of Enakalle, king of Umma, daughter-in-law of Il, king of Umma, when Shara graciously appeared,the holy sanctum she built for him,and with her life, she presented (this plate) to Shara in his magnificent temple", Louvre Museum.

Queen consort of Umma
- Reign: c. 2400 BC
- King: Gishakidu
- Spouse: Gishakidu
- Dynasty: 1st Dynasty of Umma

Location of Umma

Bara-irnun (𒁈𒅕𒉣 bara-ir-nun; fl. c. 2400 BC) was a queen consort of the Sumerian city-state of Umma as wife of king Gishakidu. She is particularly known from a gold votive plate in which she describes her genealogy in great detail. The inscription on the plate reads:

For (the god) Shara, lord of the E-mah: when Bara-irnun - wife of Gishakidu, king of Umma, daughter of Ur-Lumma, king of Umma, grand-daughter of Enakalle, king of Umma, daughter-in-law of Il, king of Umma - had made Shara resplendent and had built him a holy throne, for her life, to Shara, in the E-Mah, she offered (this ornament).

— Inscription of Bara-Irnum

The original royal line of Umma consisted in the filiation of Enakalle (possibly son of Ush) and his own son Ur-Lumma. When Ur-Lumma died, presumably without a son but certainly with a daughter named Bara-irnum, the throne was handed over to Il, son of Eanandu (who had no regnal title) and grandson (or nephew) of Enakalle. King Il was then succeeded by his own son Gishakidu. Bara-irnum married her cousin Gishakidu, thus re-uniting both strands of the royal family by a marital alliance.

The plaque is the first known mention of Shara, tutelary god of Umma.

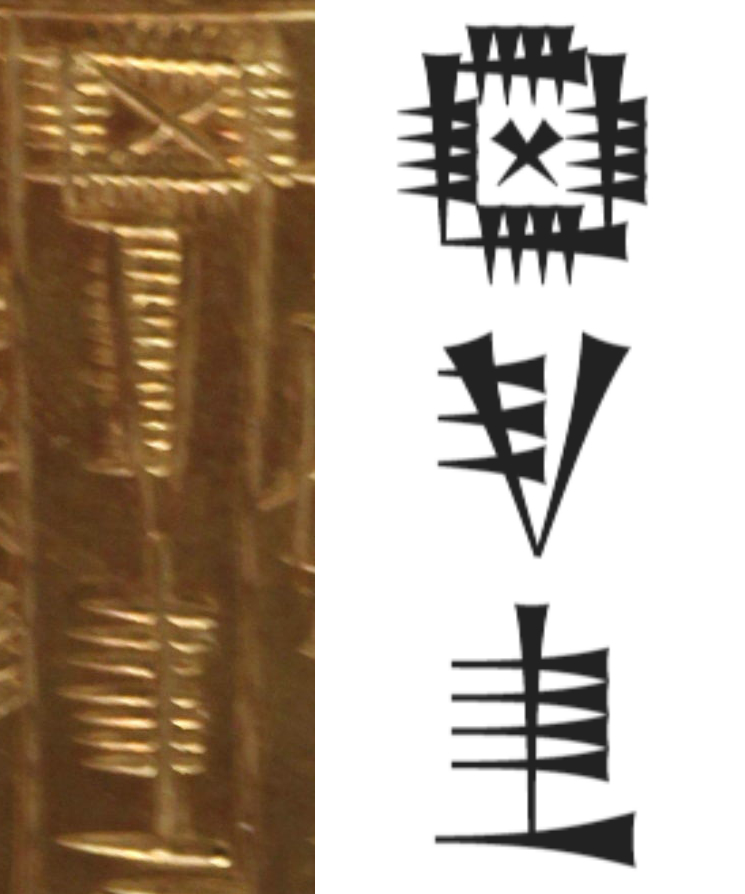
Name of Bar-irnun on the plaque, and standard Sumero-Akkadian cuneiform (𒁈𒅕𒉣 bara-ir-nun)

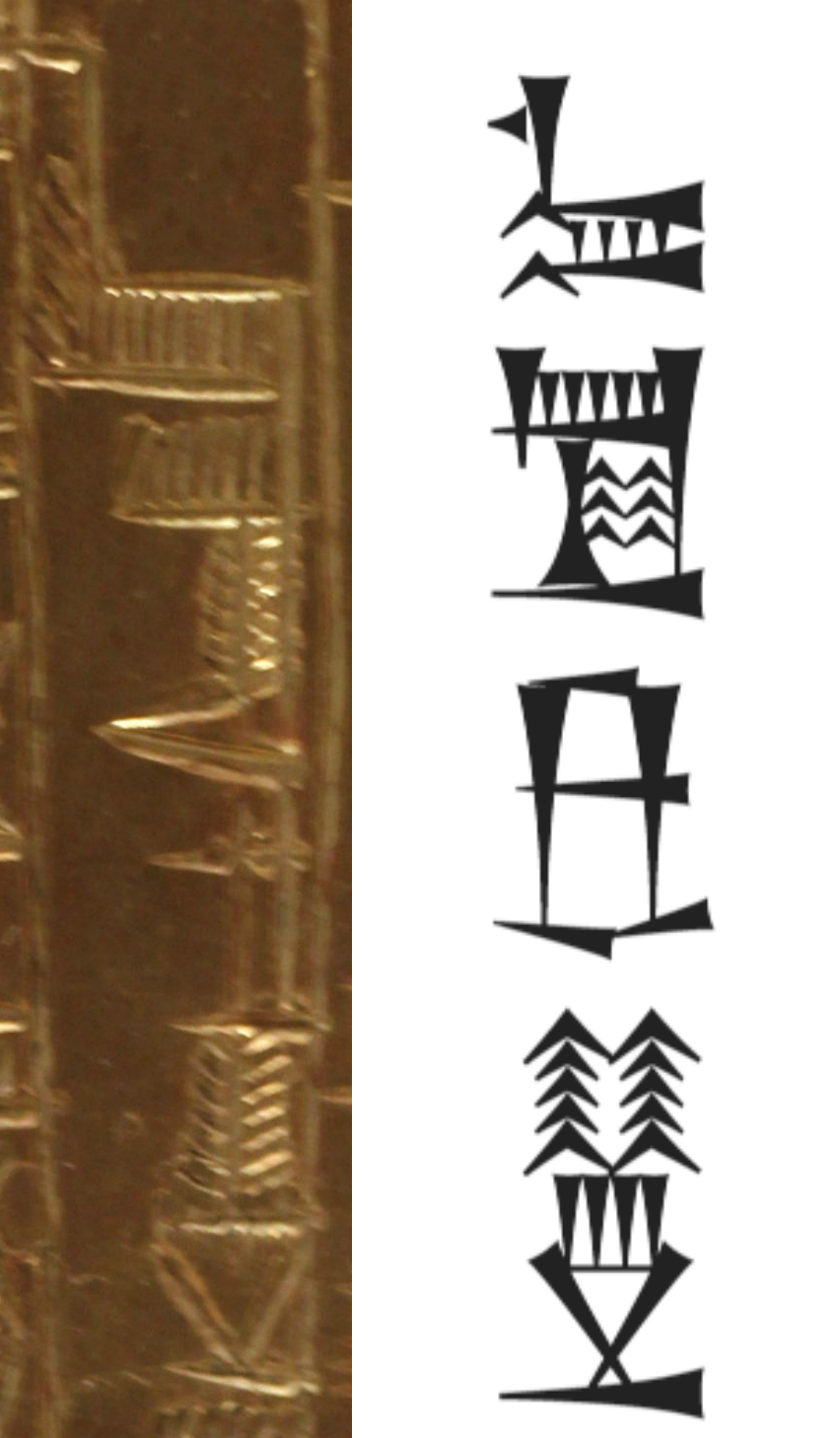
King Enakalle, grandfather of Bara-irnum, on the plate of queen Bara-irnun.

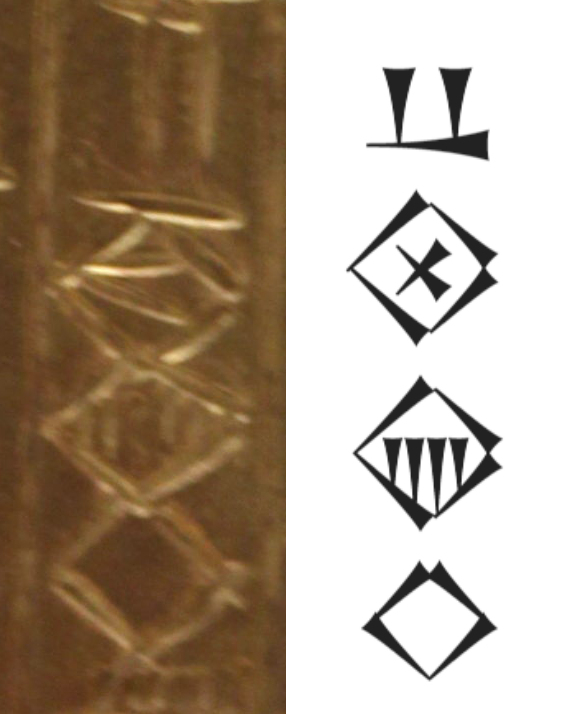
King Gishakidu, husband of Bara-irnum

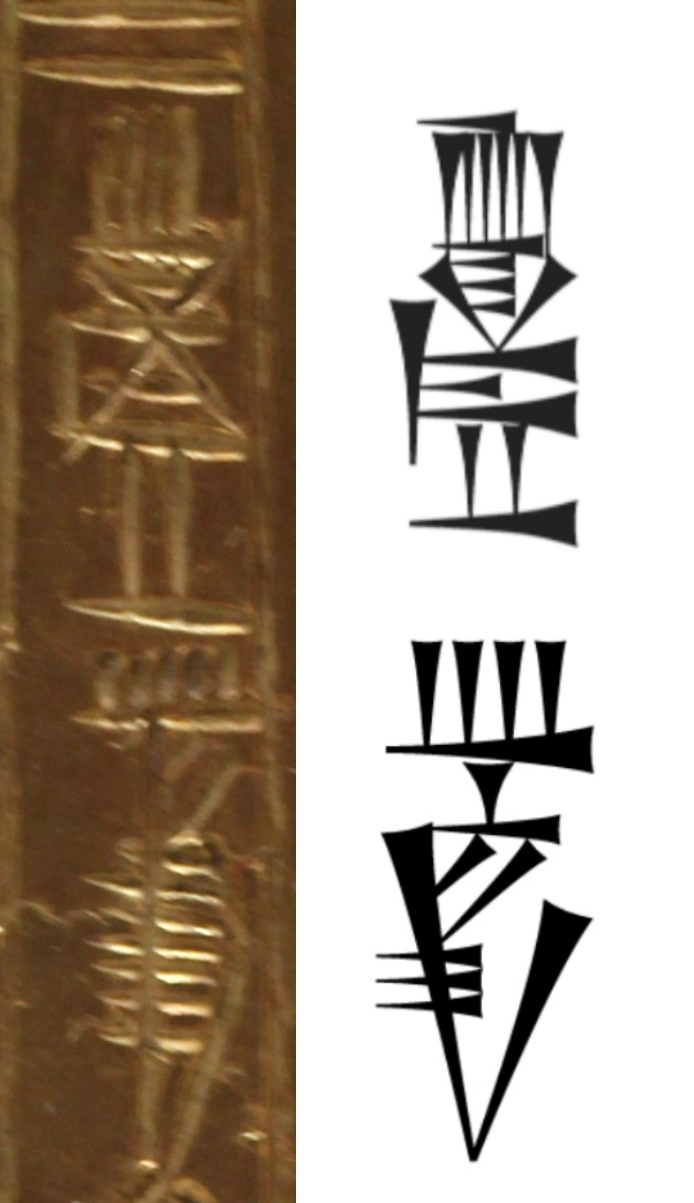
"King Il" (𒅍𒈗, Il lugal), father-in-law of Bara-irnum

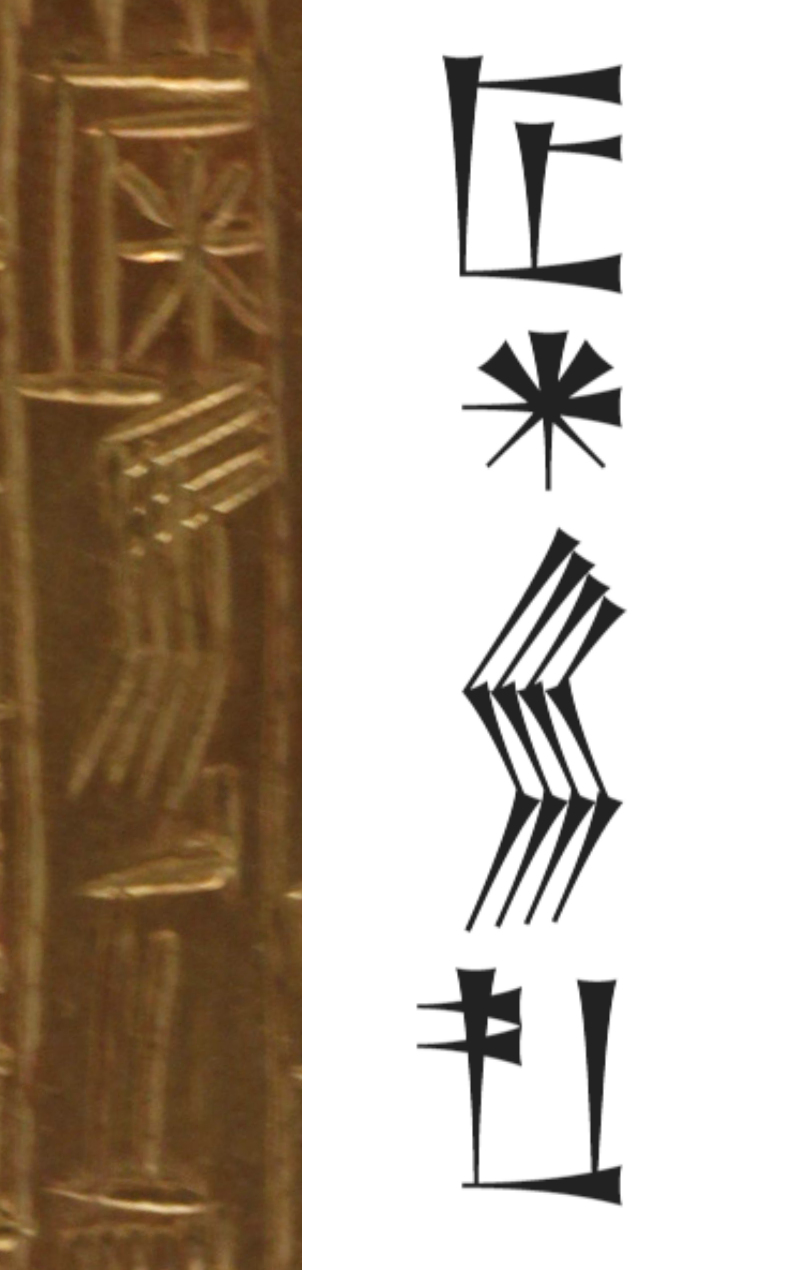
King Ur-Lumma, father of Bara-irnum
