= Ur-Lumma =

Ur-Lumma 𒌨𒀭𒈝𒈠
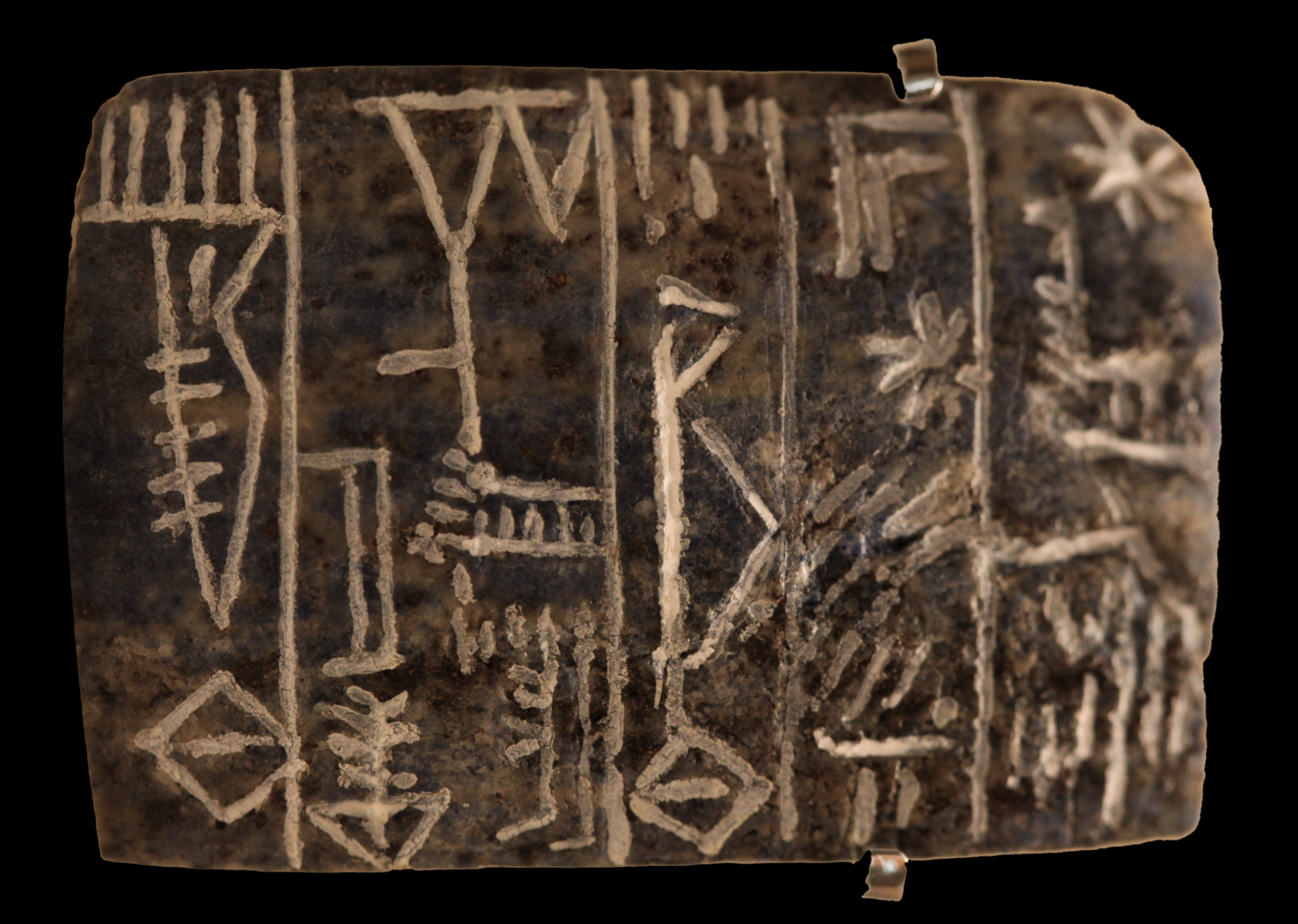
- Dedication tablet by Ur-Lumma: "For Enki-gal, Ur-Lumma, king of Umma, son of En-a-Kale, king of Umma"

King of Umma
- Reign: c. 2425 BC
- Predecessor: Enakalle
- Successor: Il
- Dynasty: 1st Dynasty of Umma
- Father: Enakalle

Location of Umma

Ur-Lumma (Sumerian: 𒌨𒀭𒈝𒈠, Ur ^{D}Lum-ma; fl. c. 2425 BC) was a ruler of the Sumerian city-state of Umma. His father was King Enakalle, who had been vanquished by Eannatum of Lagash. Ur-Lumma claimed the title of "King" (Lugal). His reign lasted at least 12 years.

Ur-Lumma again entered in a territorial conflict with Lagash, for the fertile plain of Gu-Edin. Ur-Lumma, attacked Lagash and its king Enannatum, successor of Eannatum, managing to "destroy with fire the stele of Eannatum and the shrines of the gods set up beside it". Ur-Lumma vanquished Enannatum and occupied Lagash, but he was eventually repelled by Entemena, the son of Enannatum.

Ur-Lumma was replaced by his nephew Il, a priest-king, who also attacked Lagash, but was again defeated by Entemena.

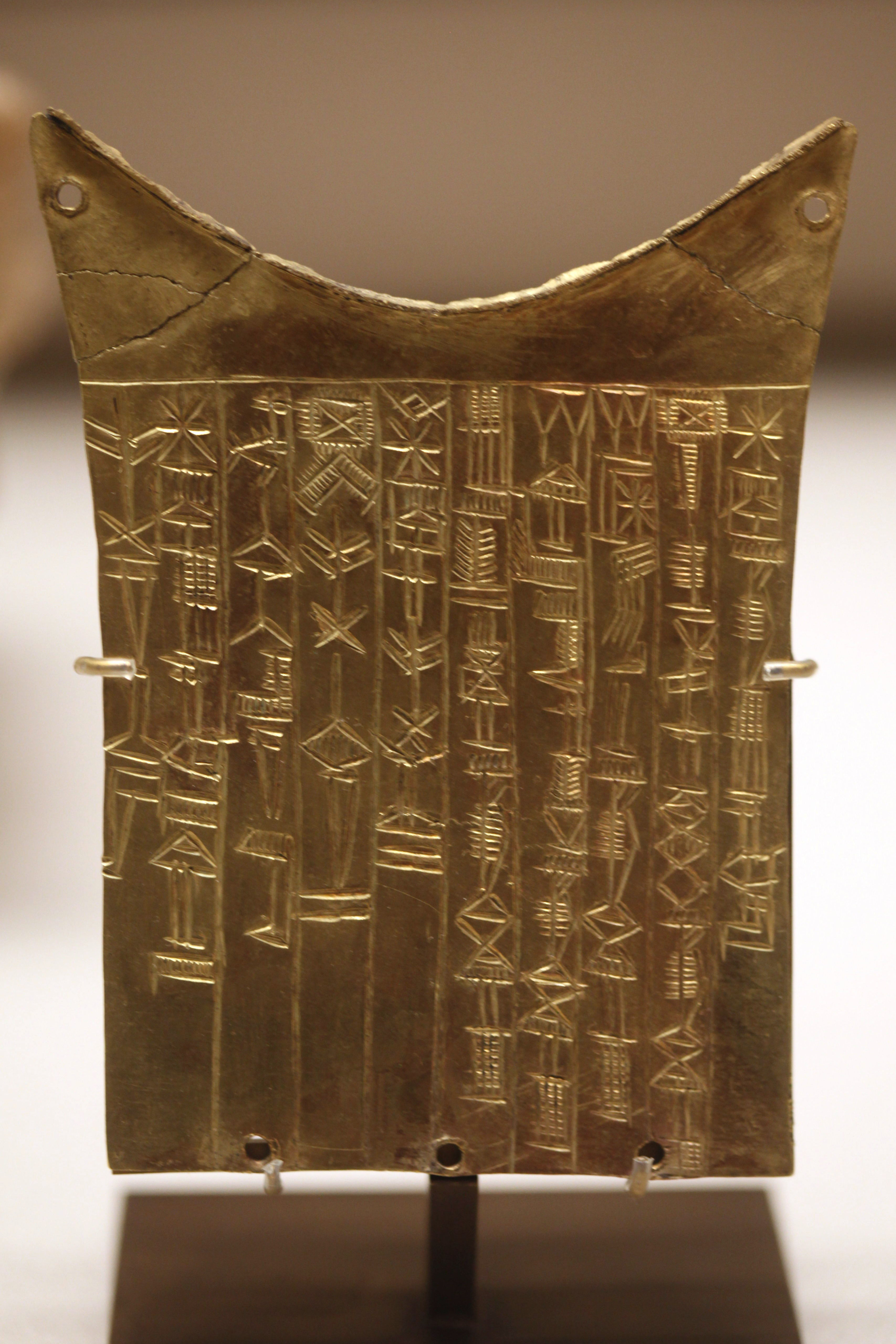
Votive plate of Queen Bara-irnum of Umma, "wife of Gishakidu, king of Umma, daughter of Ur-Lumma, king of Umma, grand-daughter of Enakalle, king of Umma, daughter-in-law of Il, king of Umma", to God Shara, in gratitude for sparing her life.

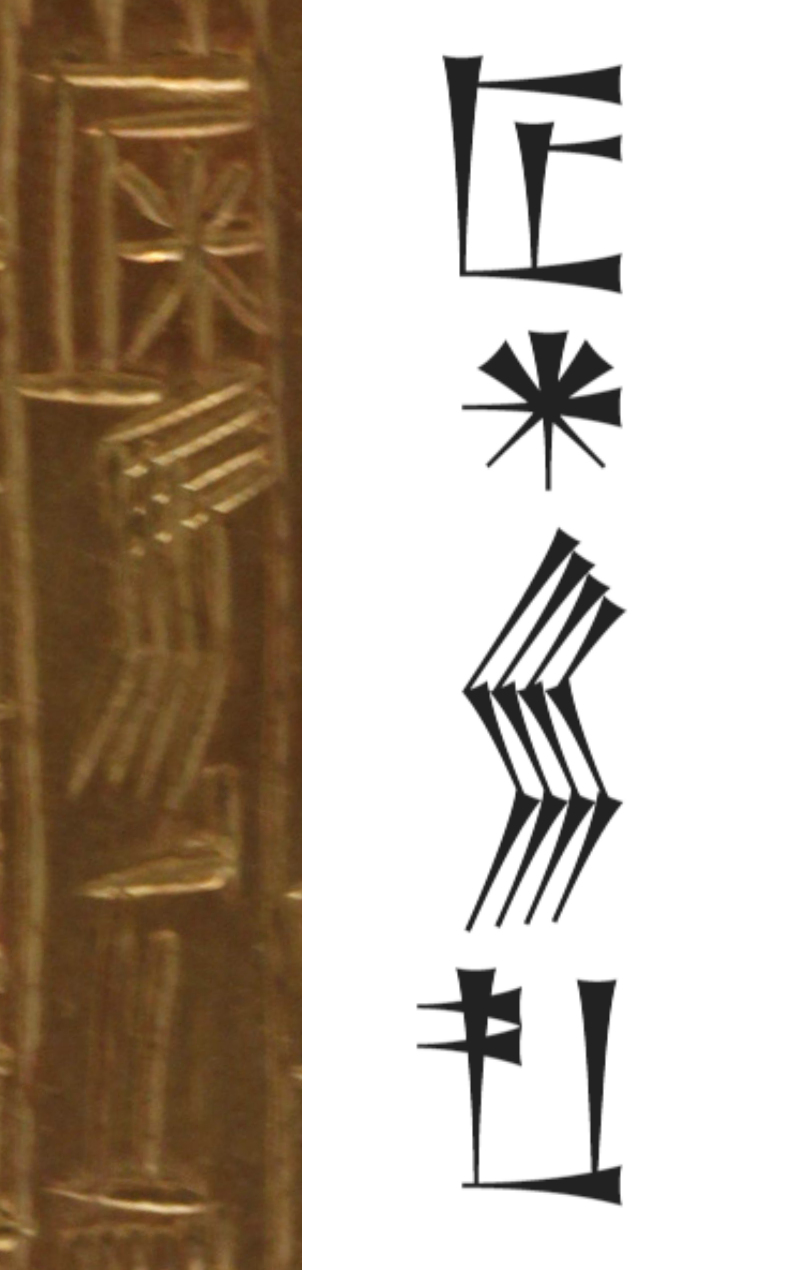
The name "Ur-Lumma" (𒌨𒀭𒈝𒂷l𒈠) on the plate of his daughter Bara-irnun (third column)
