= Enakalle =

Enakalle 𒂗𒀉𒆗𒇷
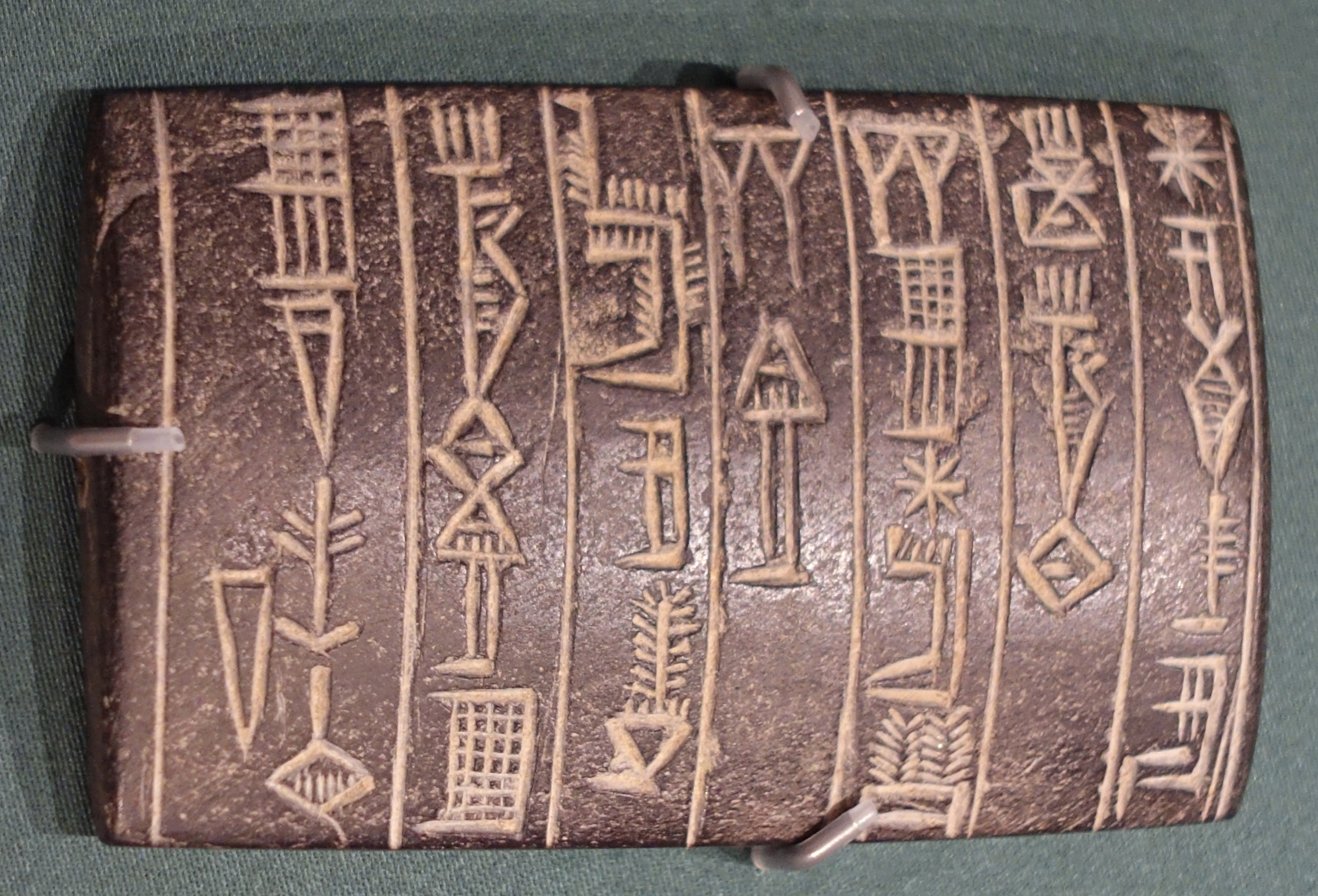
- Stone tablet for the dedication of a temple, inscribed by Il, king of Umma, c. 2400 BC, and mentioning his father Eandamu, and his grandfather King Enakalle. Oriental Institute Museum, University of Chicago.

King of Umma
- Reign: c. 2450 BC
- Predecessor: Possibly Ush
- Successor: Ur-Lumma
- Issue: Ur-Lumma
- Dynasty: 1st Dynasty of Umma

Enakalle or Enakalli (Sumerian: 𒂗𒀉𒆗𒇷, En-a2-kal-le; fl. c. 2450 BC) was the king of Umma, a Sumerian city-state, during the Early Dynastic III period (2600–2350 BC). His reign lasted at least 8 years.

== Enakalle in the cone of Entemena ==
Ush, who may have been his predecessor, attacked nearby Lagash after ripping out the stele of Mesilim, trying to take Gu-Edin, as recording in the Cone of Entemena. Ush was severely defeated by Eannatum of Lagash, in a battle recorded in the Stele of the Vultures, losing 3,600 men in battle. Ush was then toppled and put to death by his own people.

Enakalle, his successor, finally made a peace treaty with Eannatum of Lagash, as described in the Cone of Entemena:

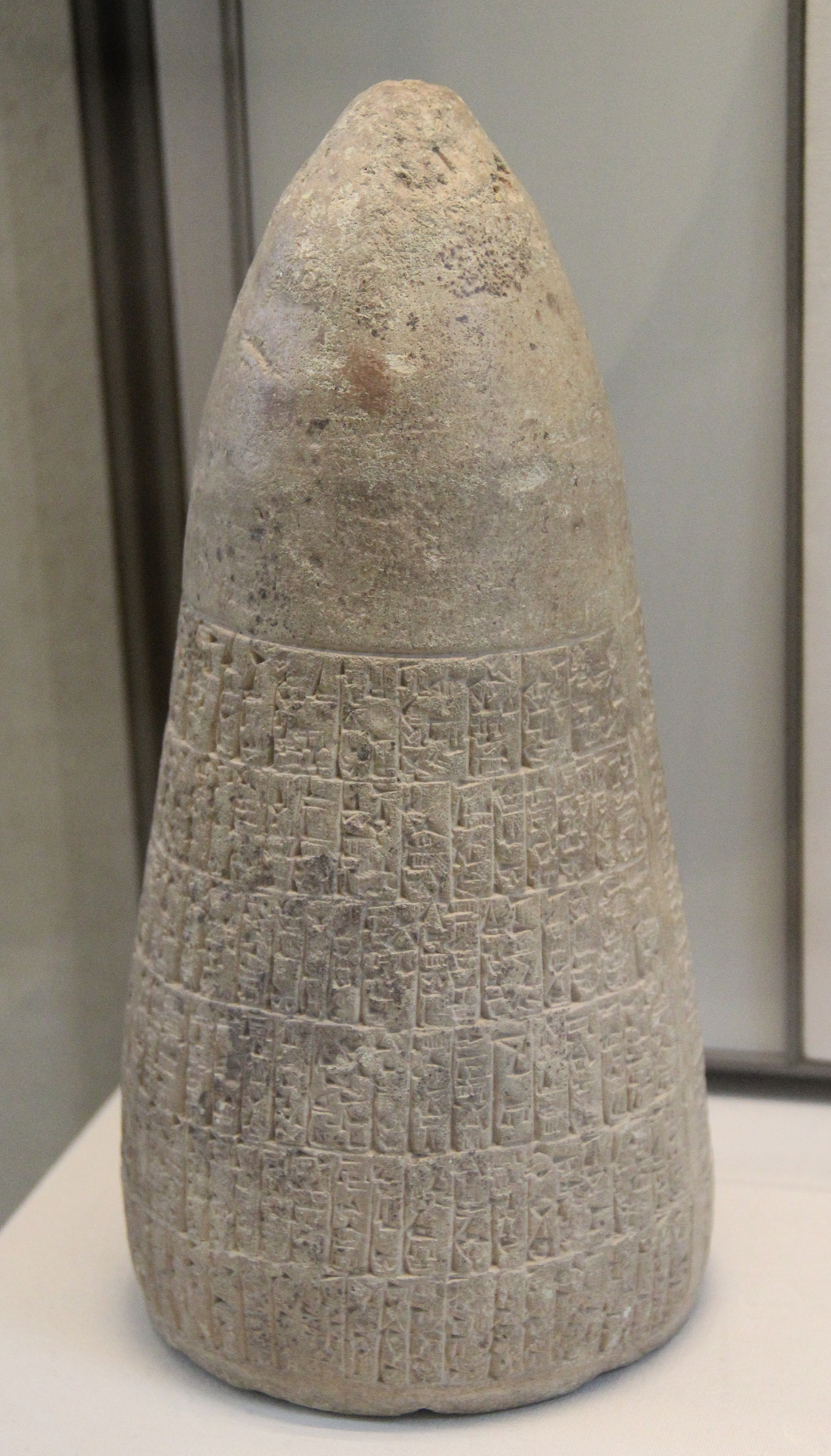

32–38

𒂍𒀭𒈾𒁺 𒉺𒋼𒋛 𒉢𒁓𒆷𒆠 𒉺𒄑𒉋𒂵 𒂗𒋼𒈨𒈾 𒉺𒋼𒋛 𒉢𒁓𒆷𒆠𒅗𒆤
e_{2}-an-na-tum_{2} ensi_{2} lagaš^{ki} pa-bil_{3}-ga en-mete-na ensi_{2} lagaš^{ki}-ka-ke_{4}
"Eannatum, ruler of Lagash, uncle of Entemena, ruler of Lagaš"
39–42
𒂗𒀉𒆗𒇷 𒉺𒋼𒋛 𒄑𒆵𒆠𒁕 𒆠 𒂊𒁕𒋩
en-a_{2}-kal-le ensi_{2} umma^{ki}-da ki e-da-sur
"fixed the border with Enakalle, ruler of Umma"
Extract from the Cone of Enmetena, Room 236 Reference AO 3004, Louvre Museum.

Location of Umma

== Enakalle in inscriptions ==
Ur-Lumma was the son of Enakalle, and his successor. He challenged Enannatum I, but was defeated by his successor Enmetena.

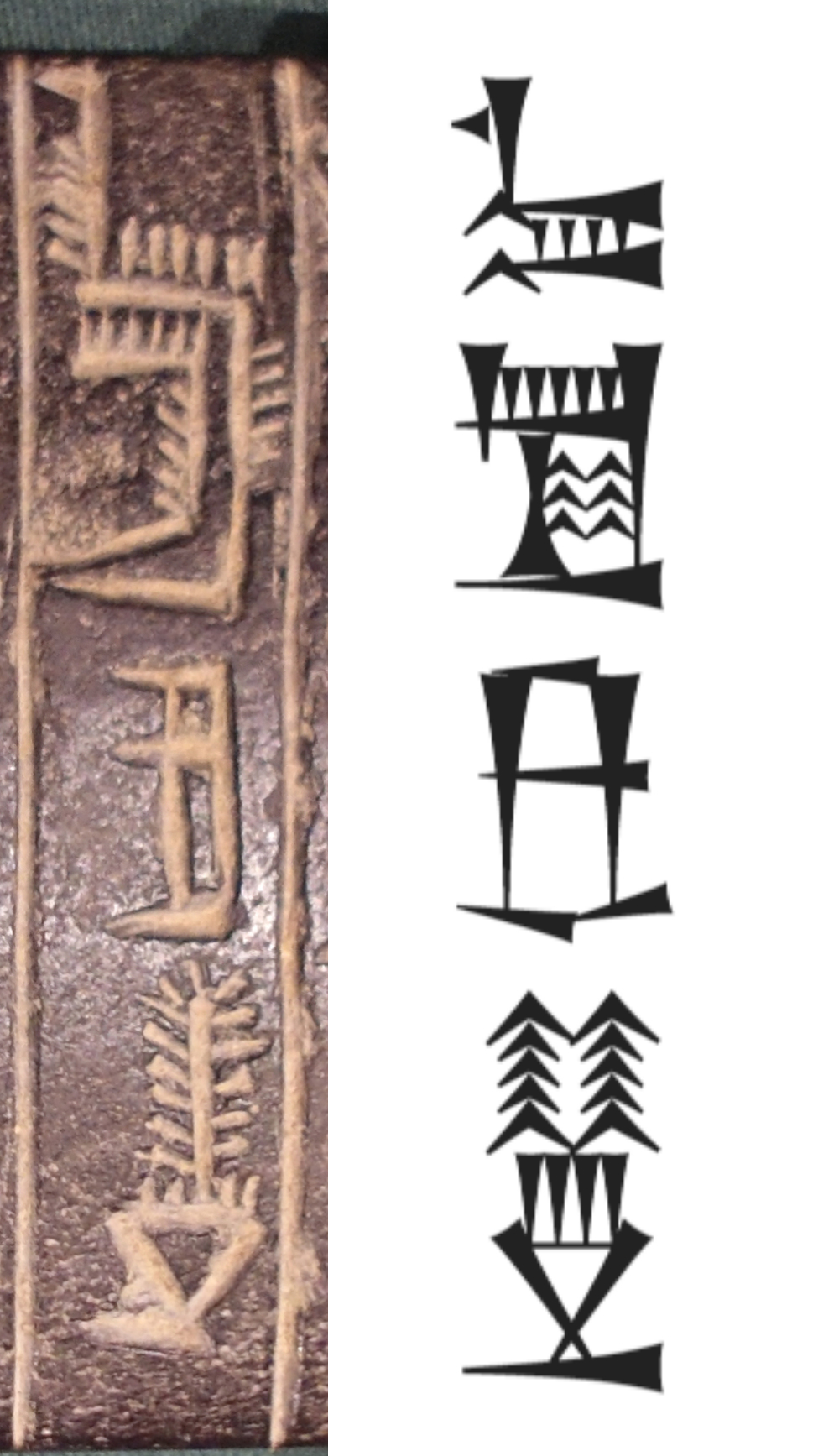
Inscription with the name of Enakalle, and standard Sumero-Akkadian cuneiform.

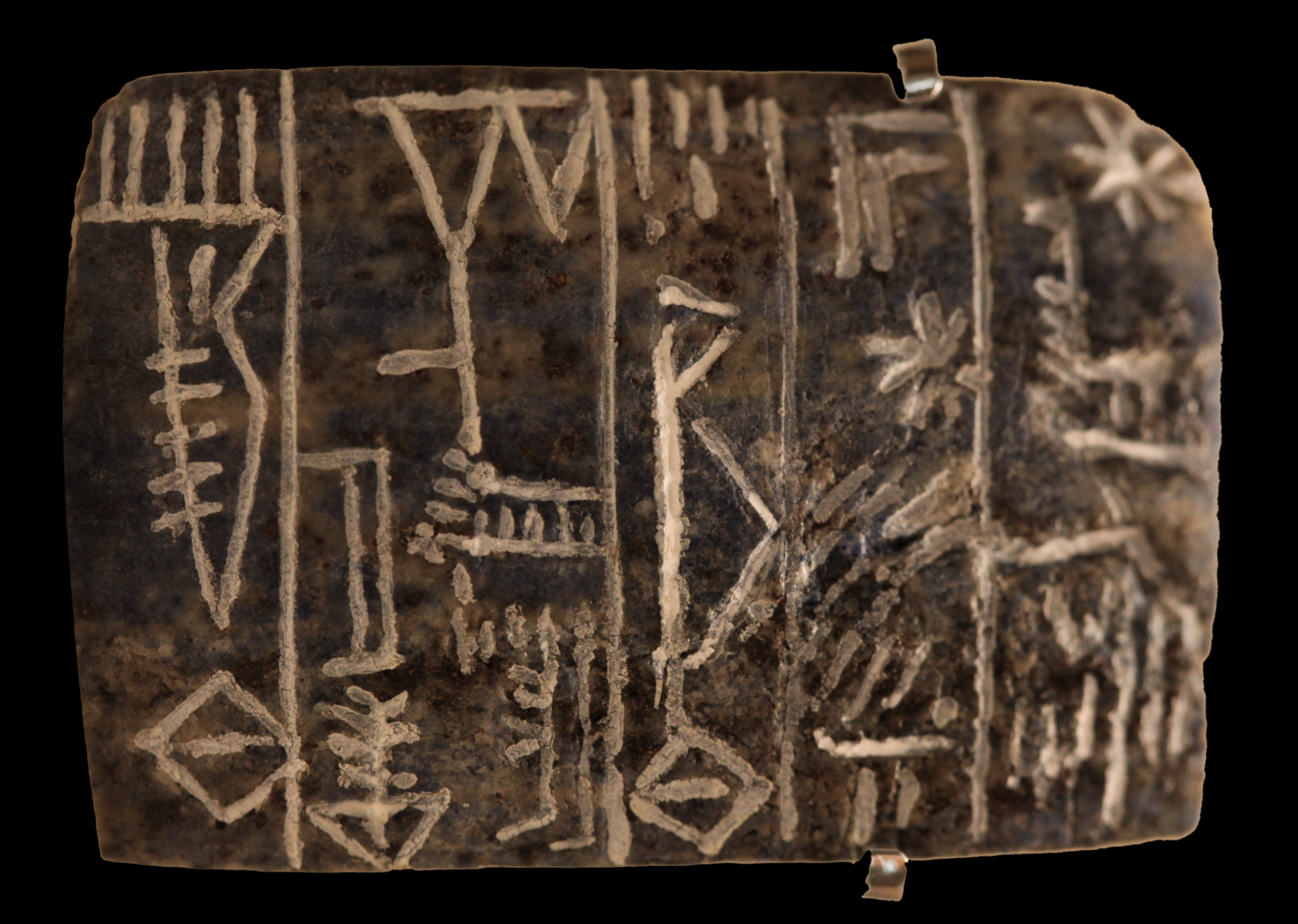
Dedication tablet by Ur-Lumma: "For Enki-gal, Ur-Lumma, king of Umma, son of Enakalle, king of Umma, built (his) temple".

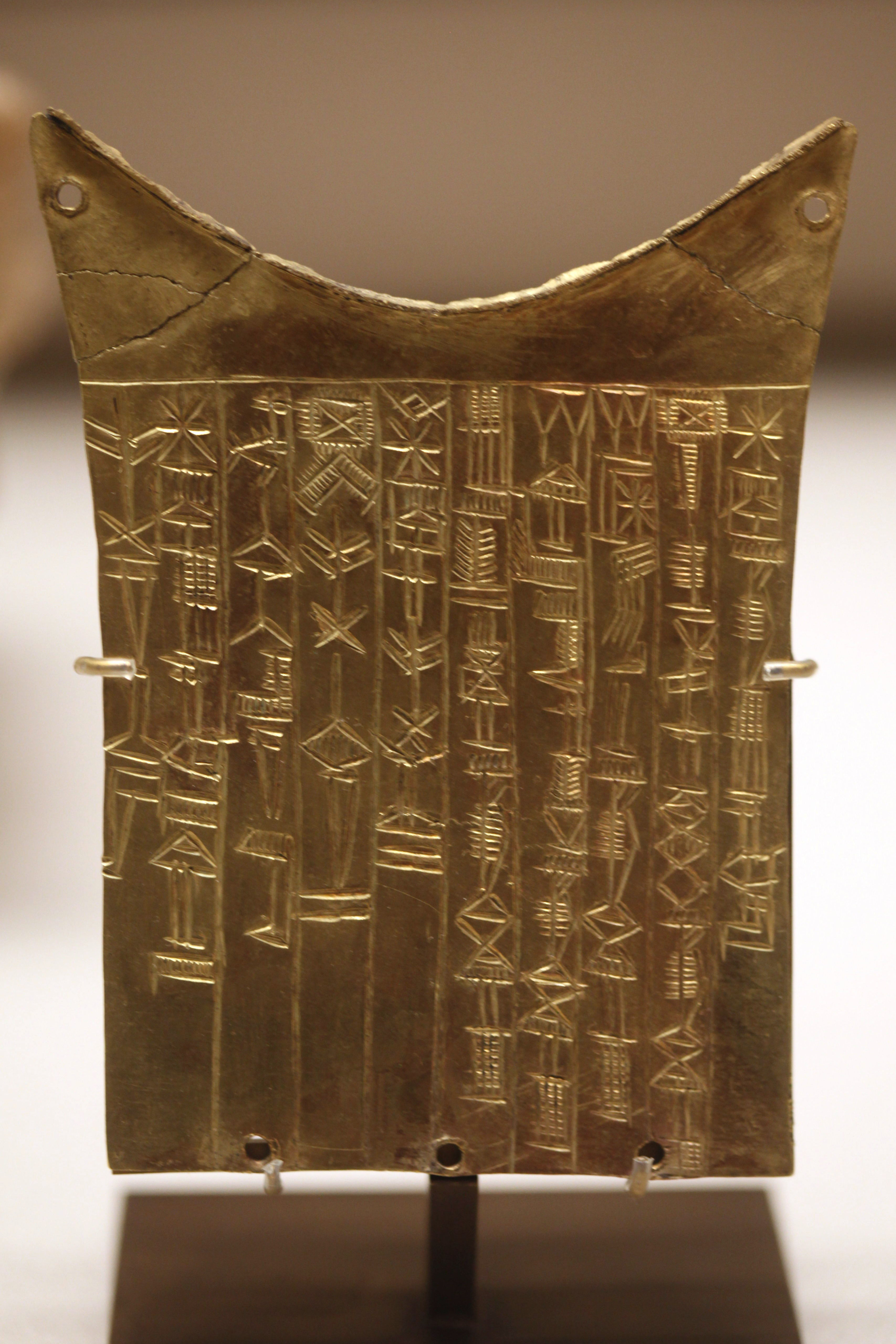
Votive plate of Queen Bara-irnum of Umma, "wife of Gishakidu, king of Umma, daughter of Ur-Lumma, king of Umma, grand-daughter of Enakalle, king of Umma, daughter-in-law of Il, king of Umma", to God Shara, in gratitude for sparing her life.

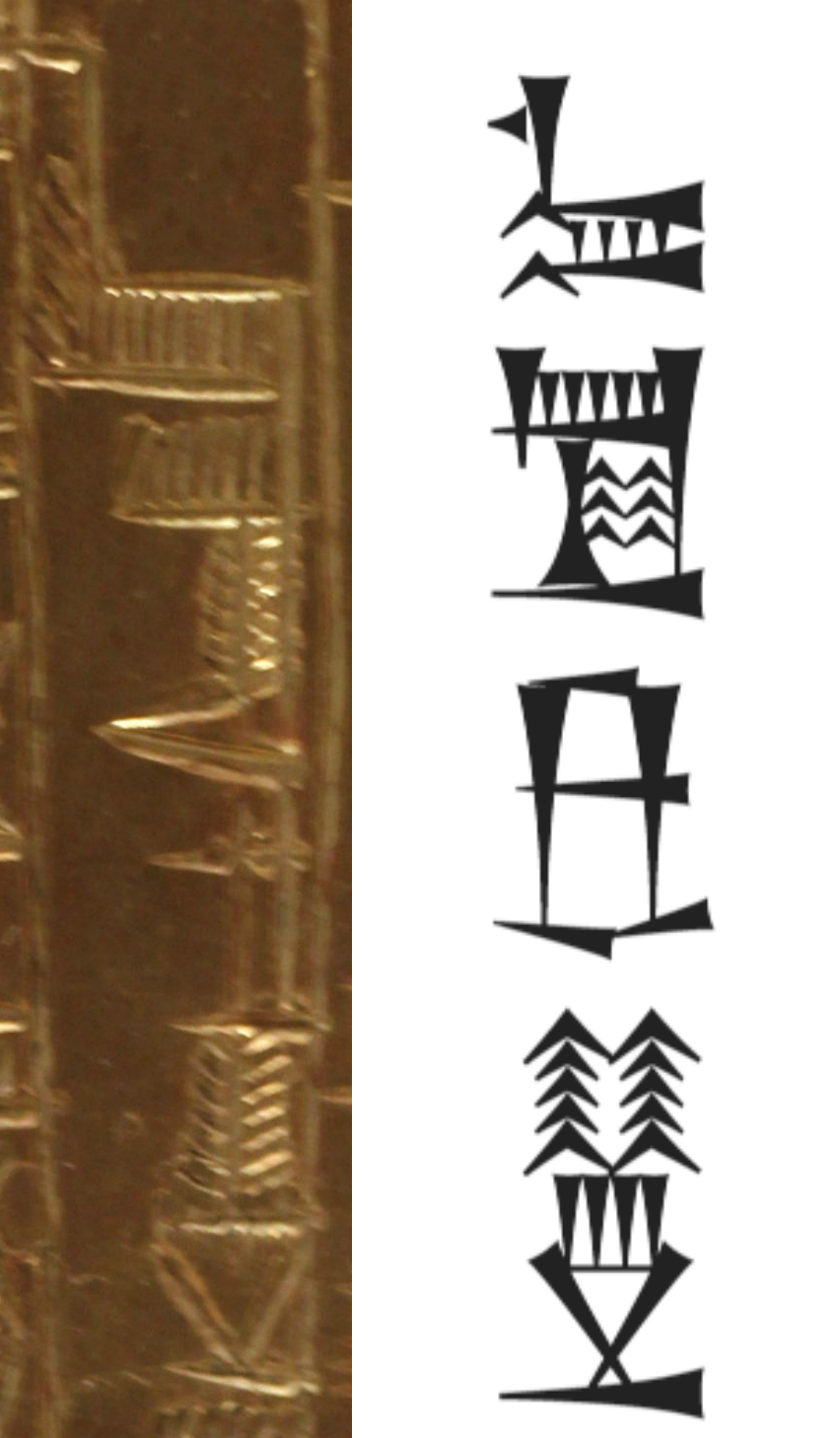
"Enakalle" on the plate of queen Bara-irnun
