= Shara (god) =

Mesopotamian god from Umma

- Tutelary god of Umma
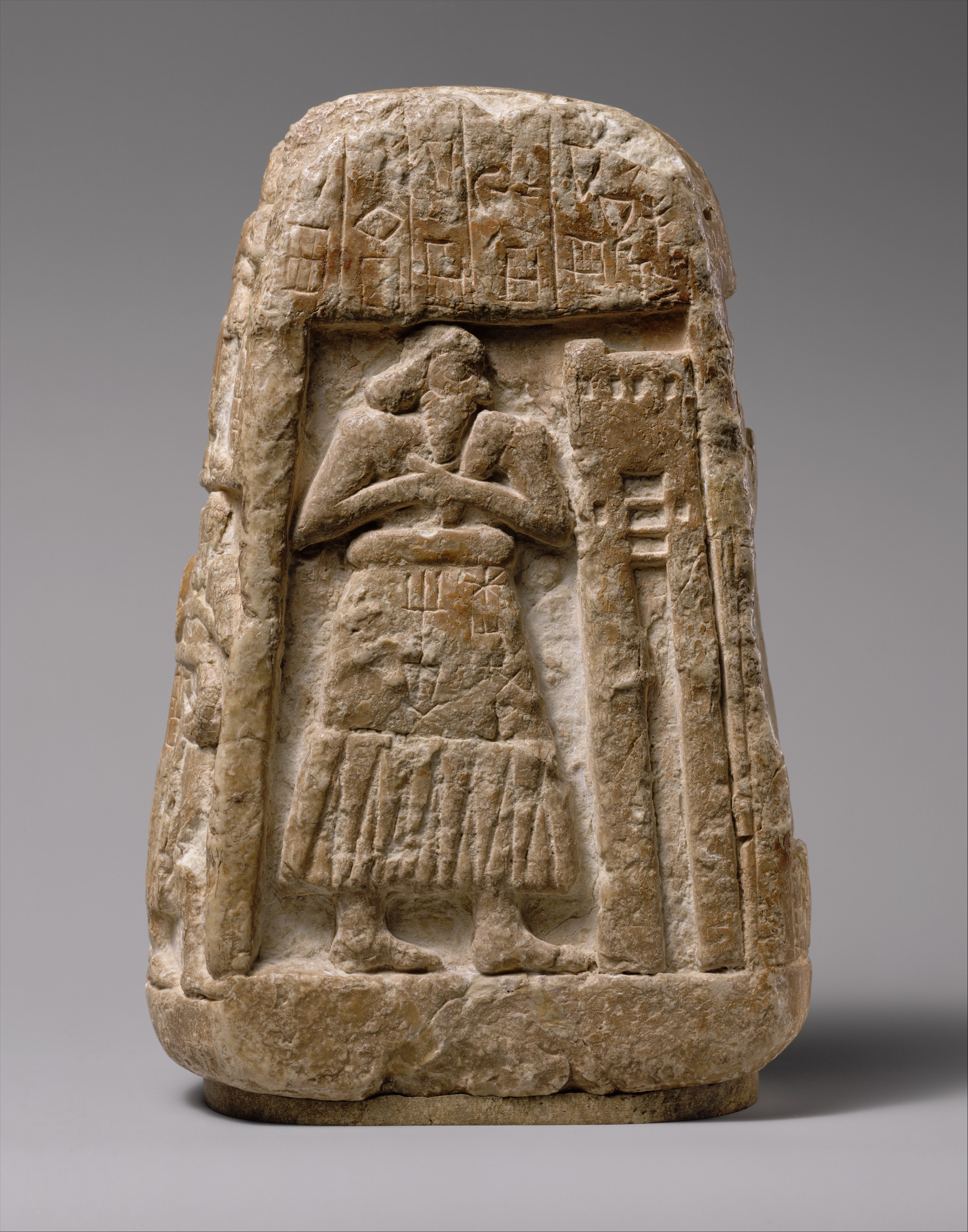
- Stele depicting a man named Ushumgal, described as a priest of Shara, dated to the first stage of the Early Dynastic Period (c. 2900-2700 BCE). Presently in the collection of Metropolitan Museum of Art.
- Major cult center: Umma, KI.AN^{ki}, Anzu-babbar
- Symbol: barbed arrow and possibly a lion
- Parents: Inanna of Zabalam and an unknown father
- Consort: Ninura (in the third millennium BCE); Usaḫara or Kumulmul (in the Old Babylonian period)

Shara (Sumerian: 𒀭𒁈, ^{d}šara_{2}) was a Mesopotamian god associated with the city of Umma and other nearby settlements. He was chiefly regarded as the tutelary deity of this area, responsible for agriculture, animal husbandry, and irrigation, but he could also be characterized as a divine warrior. In the third millennium BCE, his wife was Ninura, associated with the same area, but later, in the Old Babylonian period, her cult faded into obscurity, and Shara was instead associated with Usaḫara or Kumulmul. An association between him and Inanna is well attested. In Umma, he was regarded as the son of Inanna of Zabalam and an unknown father, while in the myth Inanna's Descent to the Underworld, he is one of the servants mourning her temporary death. He also appears in the myth of Anzû, in which he is one of the three gods who refuse to fight the eponymous monster.

== Character ==
While the original etymology of Shara's name is unknown, according to Fabienne Huber Vuillet, in Akkadian it was reinterpreted as a derivative of the word šārum, "wind."

Shara was the god of the city of Umma, corresponding to the modern Tell Jokha in Iraq. Documents from this city also record the existence of multiple secondary local manifestations of him. It is assumed he was the main god in the pantheon of the area under the influence of his cult center, and his position in the Early Dynastic god list from Shuruppak (Tell Fara) might reflect his status as a major deity. His primary function was that of a tutelary deity of the area believed to belong to him. As such, he was responsible for agriculture, animal husbandry, and maintaining the irrigation network. This role was exemplified by his epithet gugal-An-negara, "canal inspector appointed by An." A plow dedicated to him (^{giš}apin-^{d}Šará-da-sù-a, possibly to be understood as "the plow named 'Marching with Shara'") is attested in documents from Umma. He could also be described as a warrior deity, in which case his attribute was a barbed arrow.

It has been proposed that lions present on seals from Umma might be an emblem of the city, and that a lion accompanying the figure of a god on seals from this city might designate it as a representation of Shara. Similarly, goddesses accompanied by lions might represent Shara's spouse Ninura.

In god lists from the first millennium BCE, Shara could be reinterpreted as a female deity.

== Worship ==
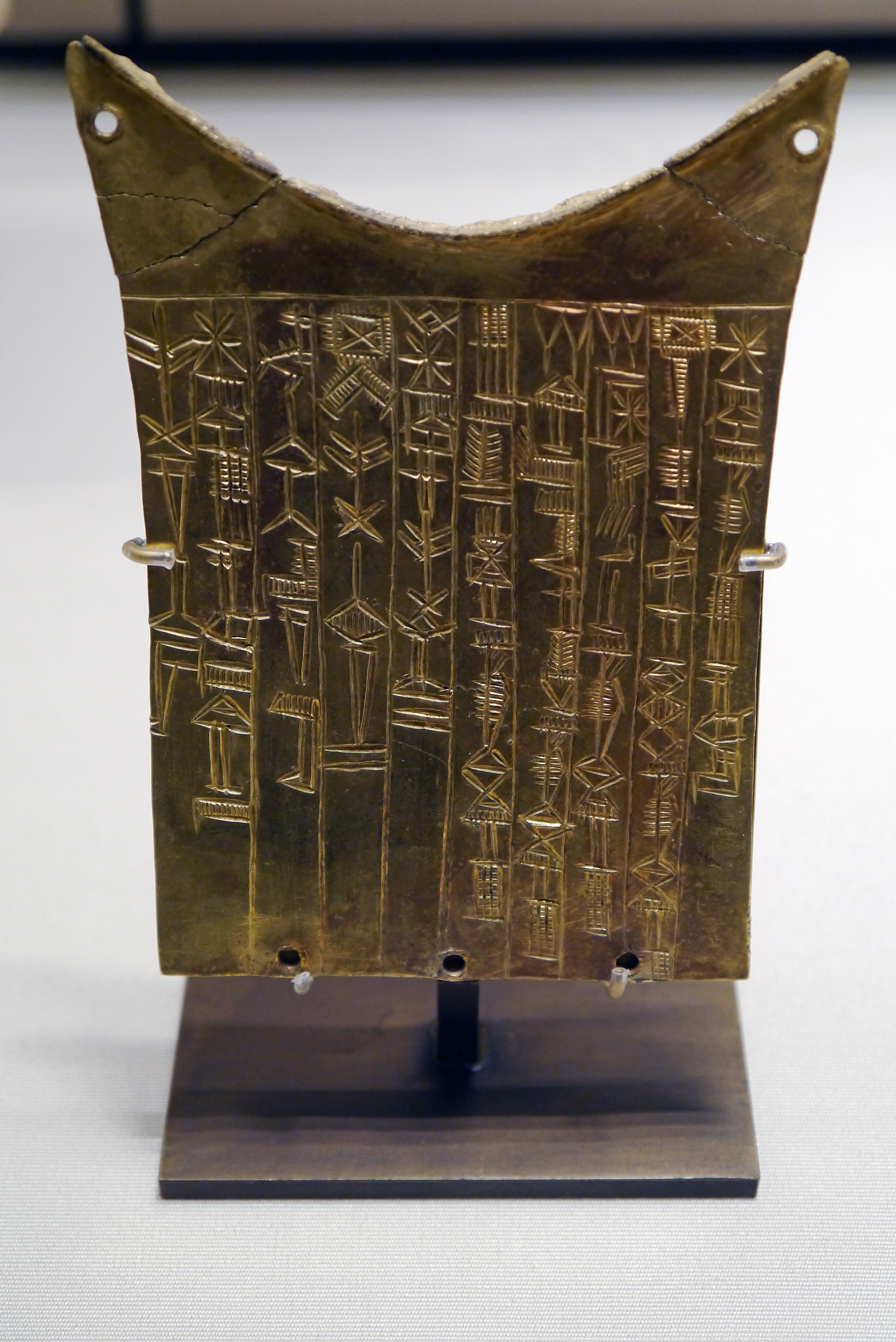
Votive plaque of queen Bara-irnun. Louvre.

Shara's principal temple was the Emaḫ, whose ceremonial Sumerian name means "exalted house." It is first attested in an inscription of Bara-irnun, the wife of Giššakidu of Umma, who reigned in the Early Dynastic period, most likely as a contemporary of Enannatum II and Enentarzi of the First Dynasty of Lagash. Textual sources also mention the existence of a ziggurat dedicated to him which bore the name Sigkuršaga, "brick, mountain of the heart." Both the temple, Abzubanda, and the ziggurat were located in KI.AN^{ki} (reading uncertain), a site in the proximity of Umma. It has been proposed that while Umma was the main cult center of Shara in historical times, KI.AN^{ki} was the settlement originally associated with him, while Umma's tutelary deity was at first Ninura, his wife. Ebursasa, "the house which prepares the jars," was either its another alternate name of Emaḫ or a designation of a specific part of it. The name might specifically refer to bursasa, a type of vessel into which wine or honey were poured during rituals. Another temple of Shara, located in Umma itself, was the Ešagepadda, "house chosen in the heart," known from inscriptions of Shu-Sin and Ibbi-Sin, who both rebuilt it.

Shara is invoked on steles from the reign of Lugalzagesi, delineating the border of the kingdom of Umma. He also represents Umma in an inscription of Entemena, according to which the border between him and Ningirsu, representing the state of Lagash, had to be demarcated by Enlil and subsequently measured and confirmed by the historical king Mesalim of Kish at the command of the god Ištaran.

Shara was also worshiped in various smaller settlements in the vicinity of Umma, often in his own temples. AKA-sal (reading of the first half of the name uncertain) and Anzu-babbar (part of the territory which was an object of conflicts between Umma and nearby Lagash) are particularly well attested. Kings of the Third Dynasty of Ur, especially Shulgi, worshiped Shara in the latter of these two locations. Two temples of Shara, which are attested in the Canonical Temple List but whose location is unknown, are the Eburdudu, "house which prepares the jars," and the Eusakarra, "house of the crescent."

Clergy of Shara is well attested, and included various types of priests, as well as purification specialists, singers, flutists and snake charmers. Also attested is a class of priestesses referred to as lukur. Evidence regarding this group is scarce, but according to Tonia Sharlach they were most likely expected to remain unmarried, and were recruited chiefly from among daughters of lesser clergy, clerks of the state administration, animal husbandry specialists and even farmers. She considers it possible that they were similar to naditu of Shamash and Aya from Sippar, but admits not enough data is available to make a definite statement regarding their role. References to some of the lukur fleeing from their posts are known, but the reasons behind this are unknown, and there is no indication that they were slaves. There is also no indication that the role of priestesses described with the same term from other cities was similar, for example there is no indication that the lukur of Ningirsu from Girsu were expected to remain unmarried and both wives and mother are attested among them, while lukur of Ninurta from Nippur came from families of very high status and functioned more like en priestesses of other gods.

Some attestations of Shara come from outside Umma and its immediate surroundings. He was apparently worshiped in Girsu and Nippur as a deity from the circle of Inanna. He is also attested in sources from Ur. However, according to Ran Zadok theophoric names invoking him are largely limited to Umma. Lu-Shara is a particularly common example. In the past it was also assumed that a temple of Shara existed in Tell Agrab, despite the location of this settlement making his presence in the local pantheon implausible, but Gianni Marchesi and Nicolo Marchetti suggest that the excavated house of worship might have belonged to the local god Iluma'tim, while the theonym written as ^{d}LAGABxIGI-gunû on a fragment of a vase from the same site is most likely be read as Išḫara instead.

Umma's loss of political influence resulted in the decline in the worship of Shara as well, which mirrors processes attested in the case of other cities of Mesopotamia and their deities, for example Girsu and Ningirsu, NINA and Nanshe or Shuruppak and Sud. According to Fabienne Huber Vulliet, the last reference to Shara as an actively worshiped deity in a text of known provenance comes from a document from Old Babylonian Ur which mentions a temple in an unspecified location. However, according to Andrew R. George a temple of Shara located in Babylon is attested in the late school exercise Tintir = Babylon, which based on the Marduk-centric theology its compilers ascribed to most likely is no older than the reign of Nebuchadnezzar I. It bore the name Ebursasa, which was associated with a temple in Umma in earlier periods. A reference to either a joint temple of Shara and Belili or an instance of pairing the Shara temple from Tintir = Babylon with one dedicated to this goddess is also present in a fragment of a topographical text which is most likely no older than the Neo-Babylonian period, though its provenance is unknown. Belili was a sparsely attested goddess who was regarded as one of Dumuzi's sisters, and in most known cases she was instead worshiped in temples of her brother. No other references to a temple of Shara in Babylon are known.

=== Outside Mesopotamia ===
Theophoric names invoking Shara are attested in documents from Susa in Elam from the Old Babylonian period, which might indicate their bearers or their families originally came from Umma, either as immigrants or as prisoners of war, possibly as early as in the Ur III period. An analogous argument has been made for people with names invoking Nasi (Nanshe) and her respective cult center. Shara is also attested as a divine witness in legal texts from Susa, though only rarely.

== Associations with other deities ==
Shara's original wife was the goddess Ninura, who was associated with the place name Ĝiša (GIŠ.KUŠU_{2}), and in the Early Dynastic document referred to as the City Gazetteer in modern scholarship she is described as its "birthing mother" (ama-tu-da Ĝiša^{ki}). It is often assumed Ĝiša (or Ĝišša) is simply an alternate name of Umma. Hartmut Waetzoldt proposes that originally it was Ninura who was the tutelary deity of Umma, while Shara was primarily associated with the nearby settlement KI.AN^{ki}. A possible depiction of Ninura is present on the seal Ninḫilia, who was the wife of Aakala, who served as the governor of Umma during the reign of Shu-Sin. Her cult already had a small scope in this period, and she is absent from later sources. In sources from the Old Babylonian period, Shara's spouse is instead the goddess Usaḫara. Fabienne Huber Vuillet proposes that her name might mean "dust day" or "dust storm." It has also been pointed out that it resembles the Sumerian term usakar and its Akkadian form uskāru, both of which refer to the crescent, and that it shows phonetic similarity to the name of Išḫara. She was referred to as the "child of the nu-gig woman (dumu nu-gig-ga). A further goddess who could appear alongside Shara as his wife was Kumulmul (also spelled Kumul), and the Old Babylonian forerunner of the god list An = Anum places both of them alongside Shara at once.

Inanna of Zabalam was regarded as Shara's mother. Julia M. Asher-Greve notes that it is possible Shara was assigned as a son to Inanna, usually regarded as childless, only to make it possible to apply the epithet ama ("mother") to her. She states that its primary purpose was to serve as a "metaphor for divine authority, particularly over cities and states." According to Manuel Molina, it simply reflected the close political relation between Umma and Zabalam. The latter city corresponds to modern Tell Ibzeikh in Iraq. Next to Inanna of Uruk, Nisaba and Ezina, its tutelary deity is one of the oldest goddesses attested in Sumerian texts. Joan Goodnick Westenholz concluded that the tutelary goddess of Zabalam most likely initially had distinct character from Inanna. She proposed that the goddess Nin-UM (reading and meaning of the second sign are unknown), who in one of the Early Dynastic Zame Hymns is identified with Inanna of Zabalam, might have been the original deity of this city. Nin-UM also shows affinity with the god of Der, Ištaran. In a later collection of hymns, the Temple Hymns, Inanna of Zabalam, Inanna of Uruk, and "Inanna of Ulmaš" (Ishtar of Agade, whose temple was the E-Ulmaš) are treated as separate goddesses. At the same time, Inanna of Zabalam was associated with Ninshubur and Nanaya in Umma, much like Inanna of Uruk was in her city. Both Inanna of Zabalam and Shara were also worshiped alongside Dumuzi. An association between this god and Shara is also attested in a ritual text from the Ur III period, but its character is unknown. The identity of Shara's father in the tradition of Umma cannot be determined with a certainty, as the most direct reference to him, the phrase aia DINGIR ù-TU-zu in a hymn, has two possible translations: "your father An who engendered you," or "your divine father who engendered you."

In god lists, Shara consistently occurs in the circle of Inanna and Dumuzi after the Ur III period. The Old Babylonian forerunner of An = Anum places him next to a group of deities associated with the steppe: Lulal, Latarak and Lugaledinna. A single Neo-Babylonian god list equates him with Adad. According to Daniel Schwemer, it is presently impossible to tell what this equation relied on. While in an Old Babylonian god list from Nippur ^{d}Ša-ra is placed right after the weather god, according to Fabienne Huber Vuillet the deity meant in this case is his similarly named wife Shala, not Shara.

== Mythology ==
Both Shara himself and a location associated with him, the Sigkuršaga, appear in the myth Inanna's Descent to the Underworld. When Inanna looks for a substitute after being released from the underworld, Shara is one of the candidates she considers, but since much like Ninshubur and Lulal he was properly mourning her death, she tells the demons accompanying her to spare him. According to Andrew C. Cohen, in this composition he is represented as Inanna's servant like the other two aforementioned deities.

In the myth of Anzû, Shara is the final of the three gods who decline to fight the eponymous monster, the other two being Adad and Girra.

Shara is briefly referenced in Lugalbanda and the Anzud bird, where during a meeting with Inanna the eponymous hero, Lugalbanda, is compared both to him and to Dumuzi.
