= Enannatum I =

Enannatum I 𒂗𒀭𒈾𒁺
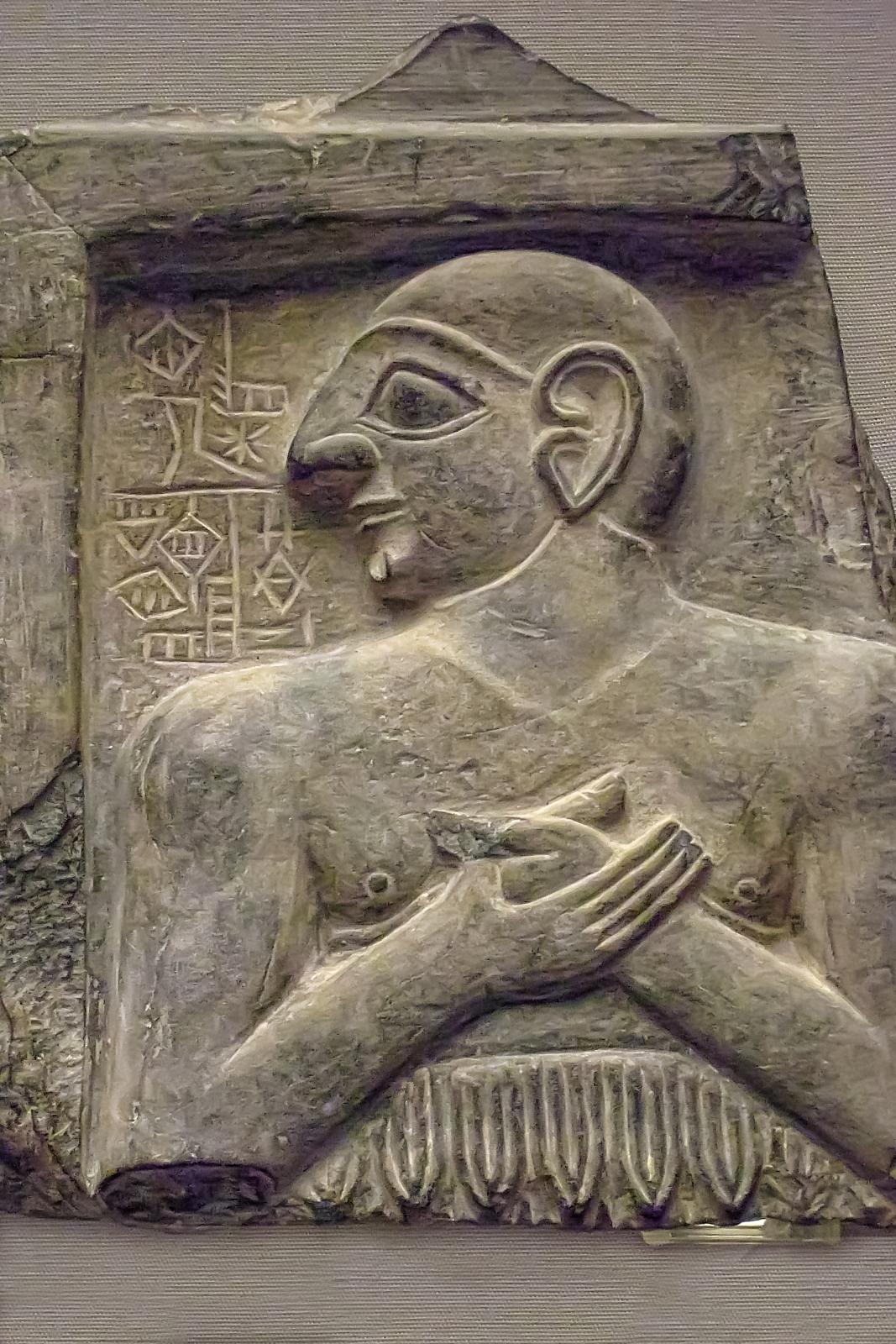
- The inscription "Enannatum, Ensi of Lagash" (𒂗𒀭𒈾𒁺 𒑐𒋼𒋛 𒉢𒁓𒆷𒆠) is located before the profile of Enannatum, vertically. Detail of a stone plaque. c. 2420 BC. From Girsu, Iraq. The British Museum, London.

King of Lagash
- Reign: c. 2425 BC
- Predecessor: Eannatum
- Successor: Entemena
- Spouse: Ashumen
- Issue: Meannesi; Lummatur; Entemena
- Dynasty: 1st Dynasty of Lagash
- Father: Akurgal

Location of Lagash

Enannatum I (Sumerian: 𒂗𒀭𒈾𒁺, EN.AN.NA-tum_{2} fl. c. 2425 BC), son of Akurgal, succeeded his brother Eannatum as Ensi (ruler, king) of Lagash. During his rule, Umma once more asserted independence under its ensi Ur-Lumma, who attacked Lagash unsuccessfully. After several battles, Enannatum I finally defeated Ur-Lumma. Ur-Lumma was replaced by a priest-king, Il, who also attacked Lagash.

Enannatum had a son named Meannesi, who is known for dedicating a statue for the life of his father and mother. He has two other sons, Lummatur and Entemena, the latter succeeding him to the throne. His wife was named Ashumen.

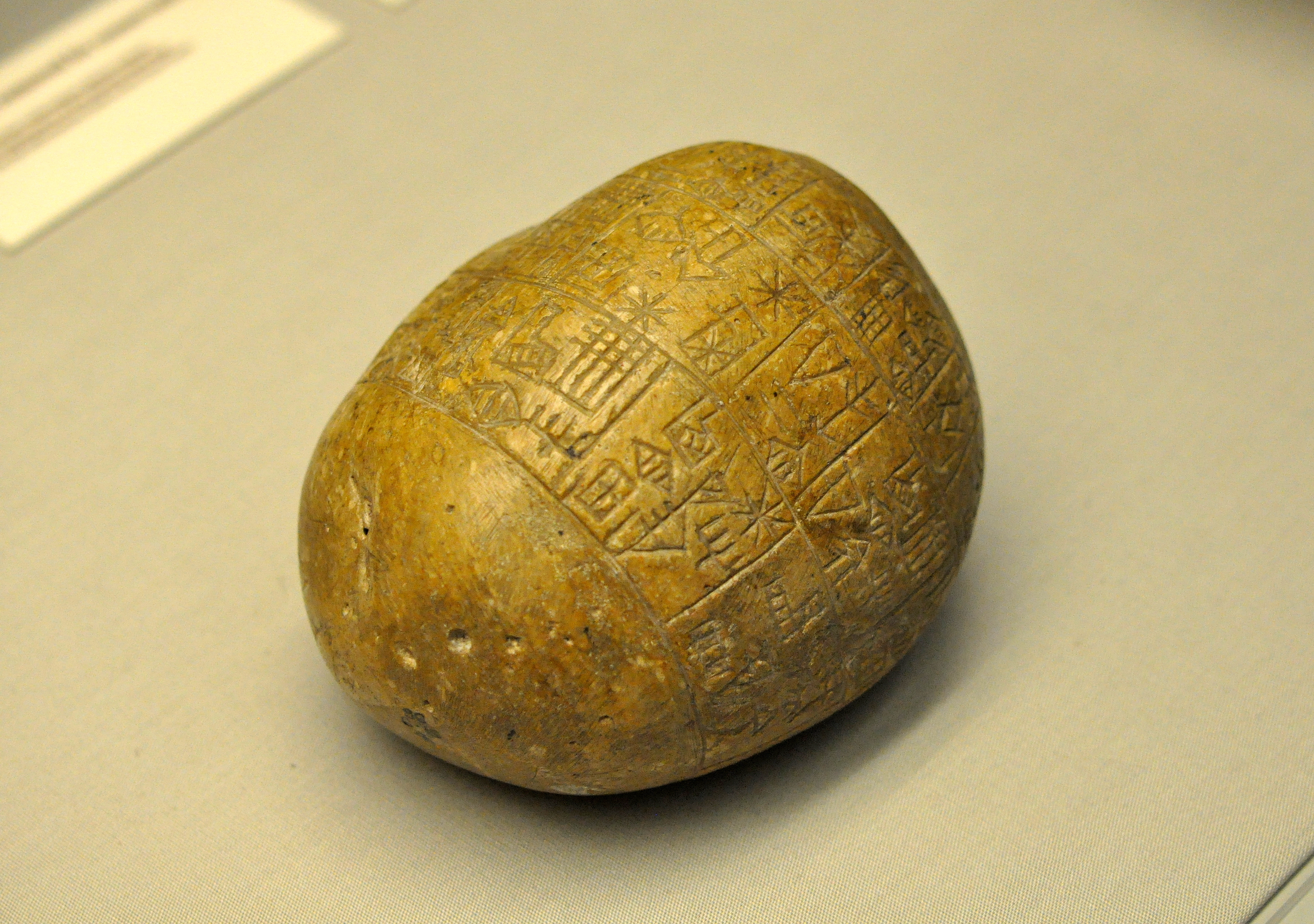
The cuneiform text states that Enannatum I reminds the gods of his prolific temple achievements in Lagash. Circa 2400 BCE. From Girsu, Iraq. The British Museum, London.

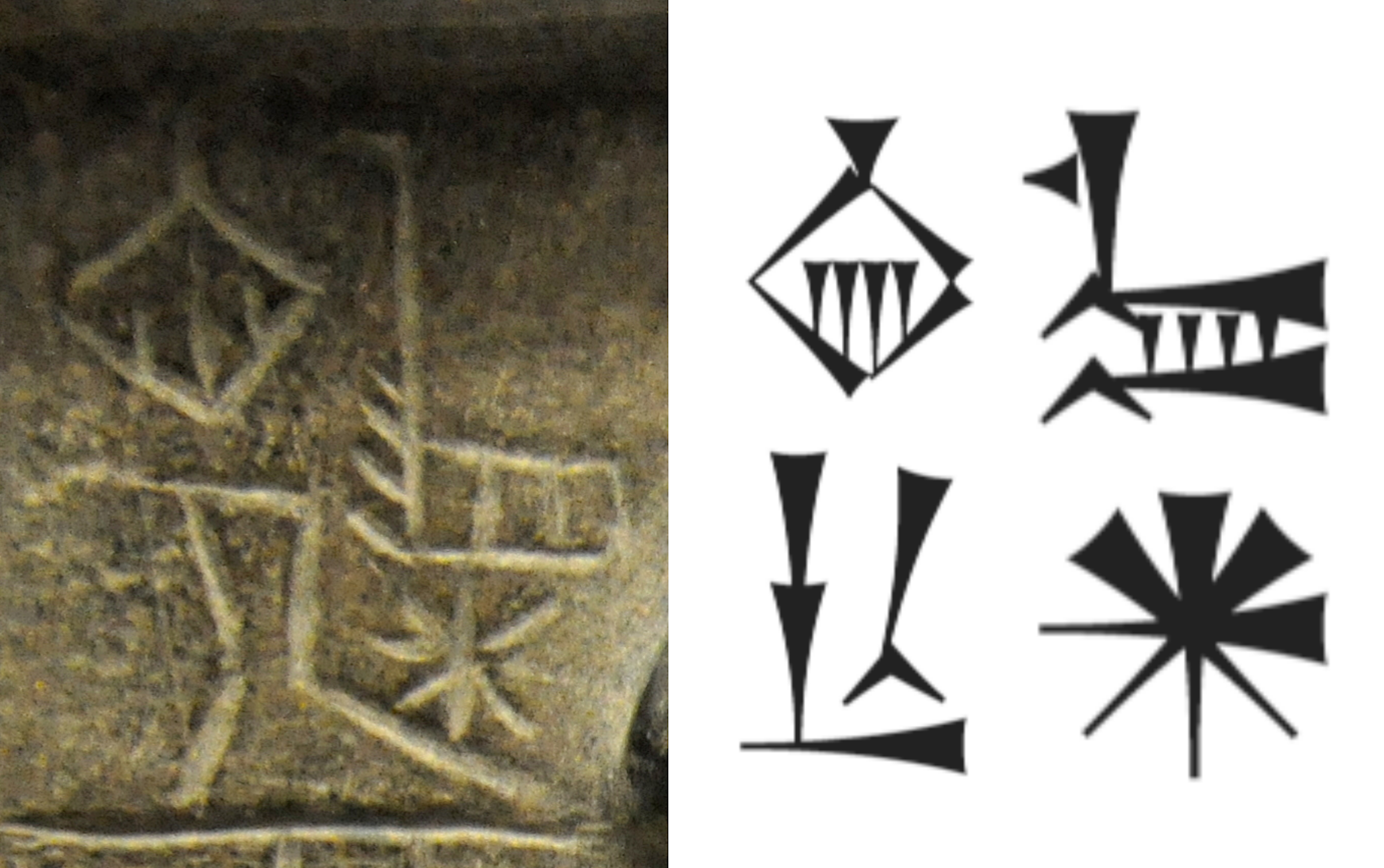
The name "En-annatum" in cuneiform

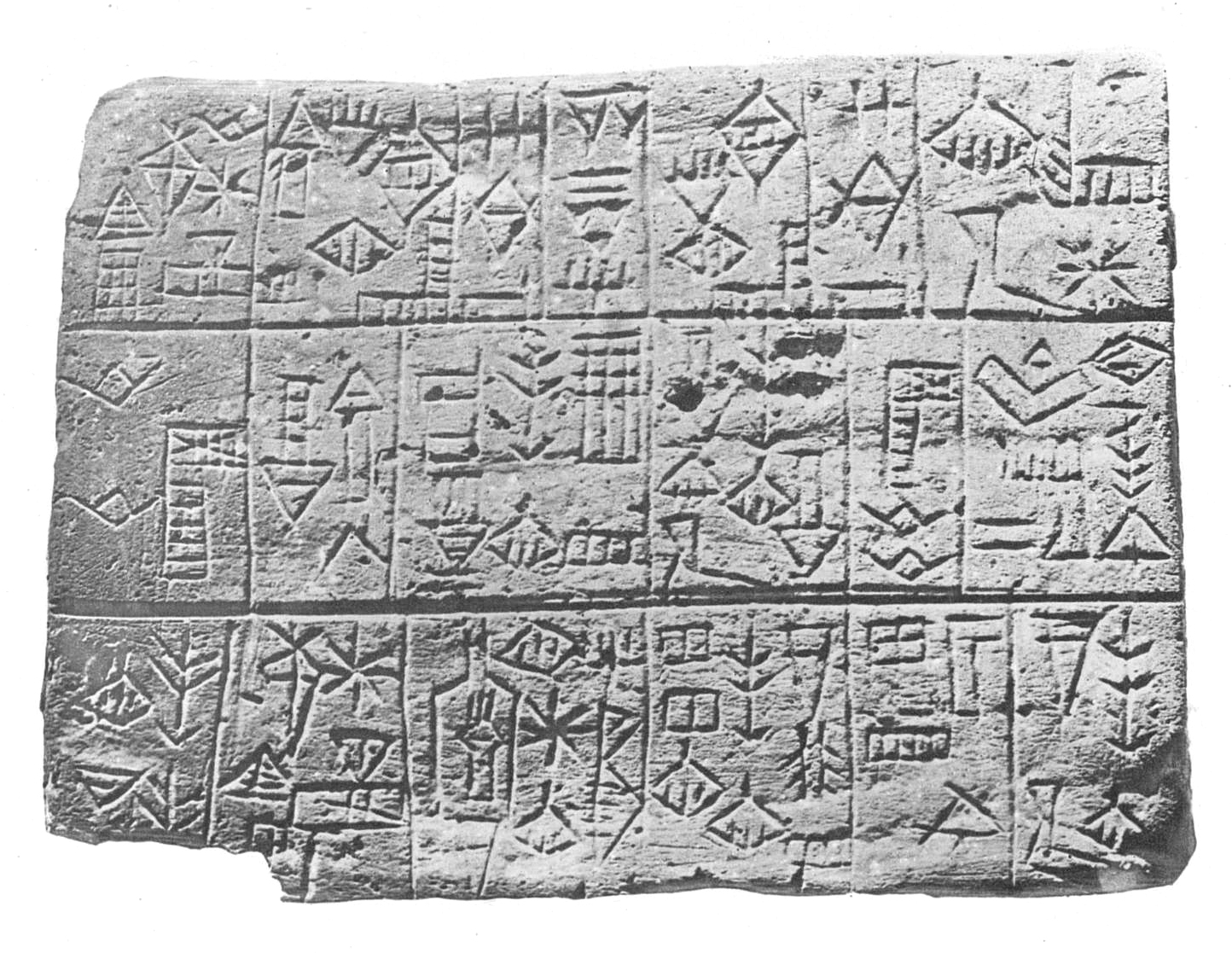
Tablet of Enannatum I: "Enannatum, ensi of Lagash, son of Akurgal, ensi of Lagash, built a temple to Ningirsu,...."

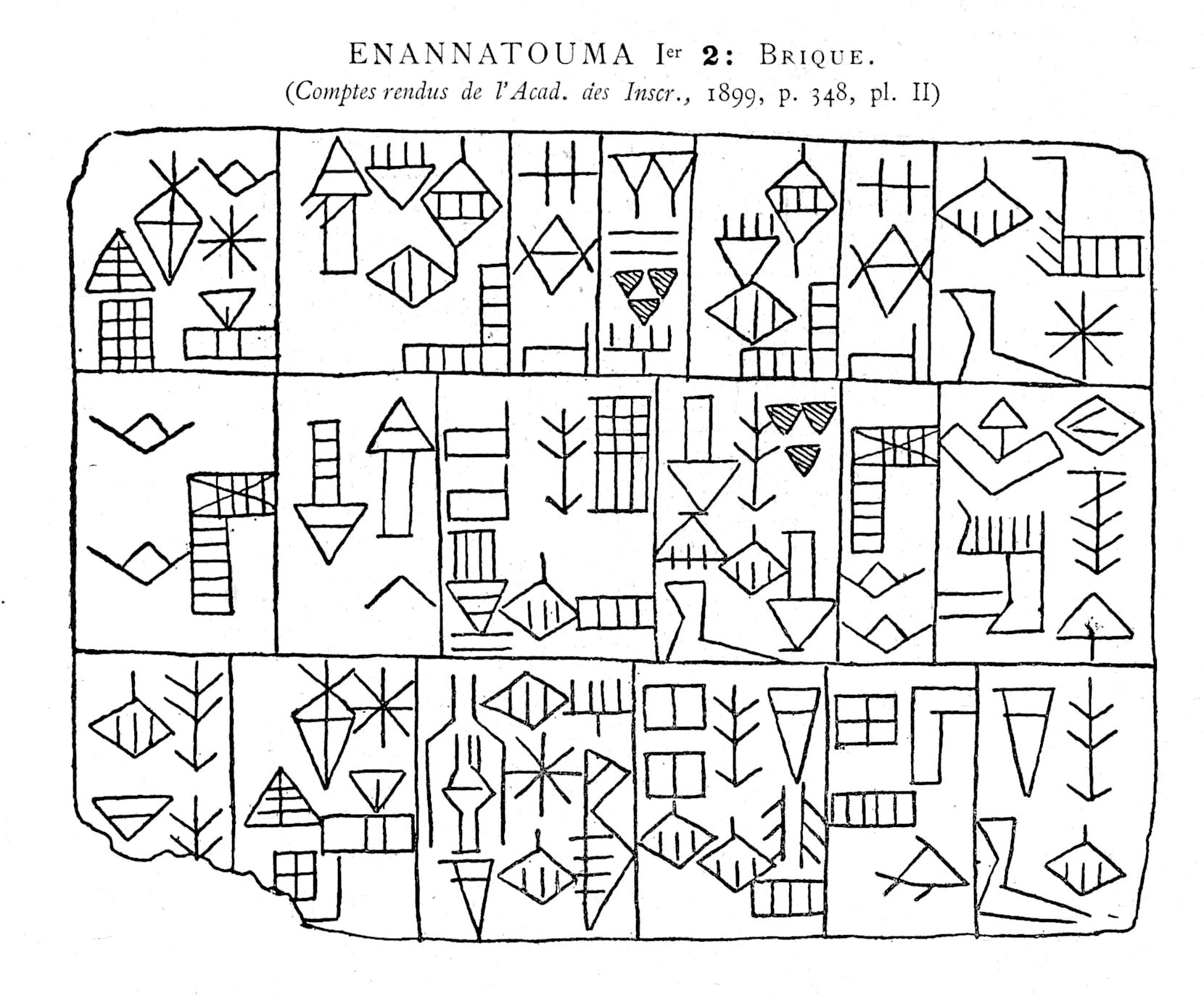
Tablet of Enannatum I: "Enannatum, ensi of Lagash, son of Akurgal, ensi of Lagash, built a temple to Ningirsu,...."

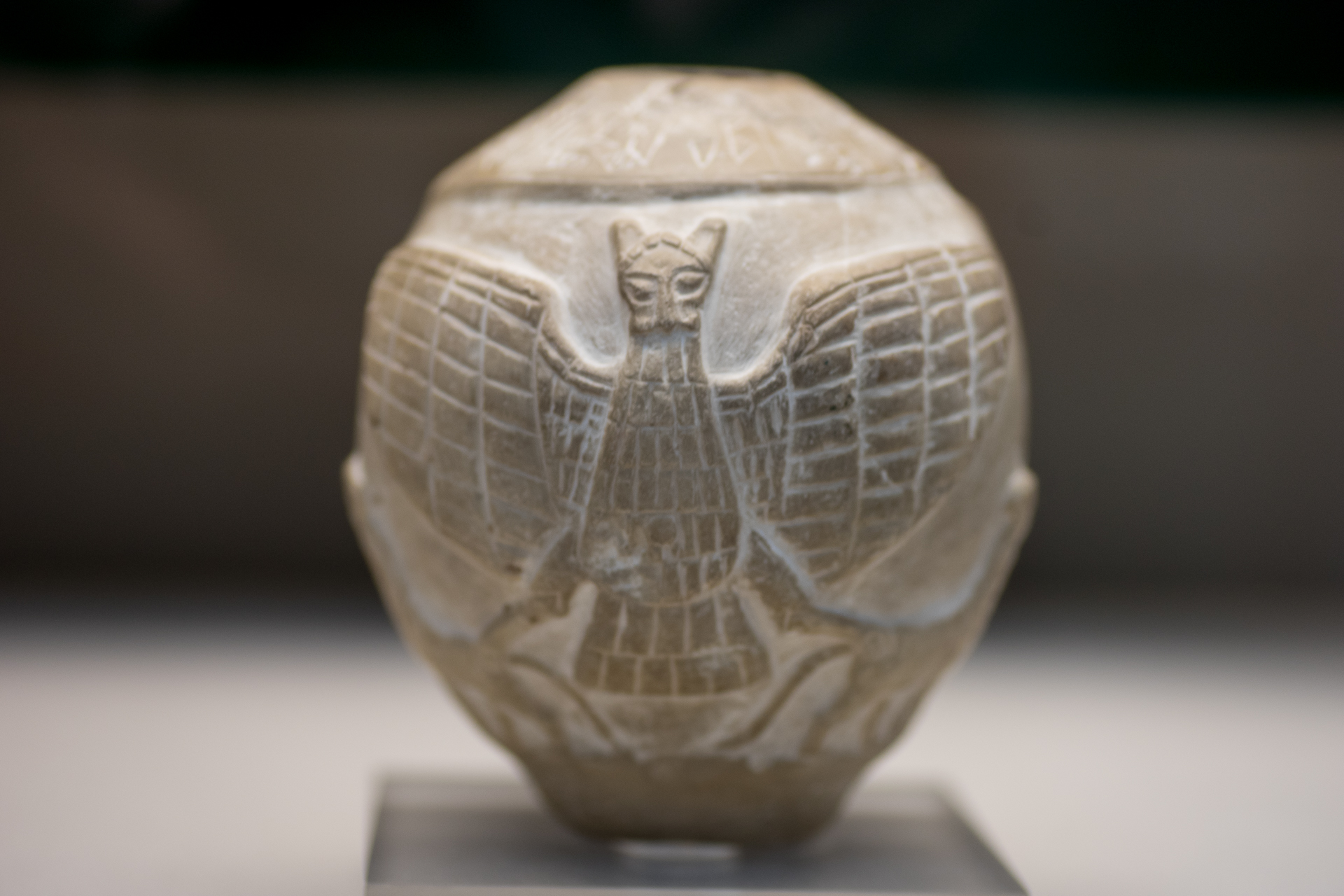
Mace head with the eagle of Lagash, dedicated to the life of Enannatum, possibly Enannatum II.

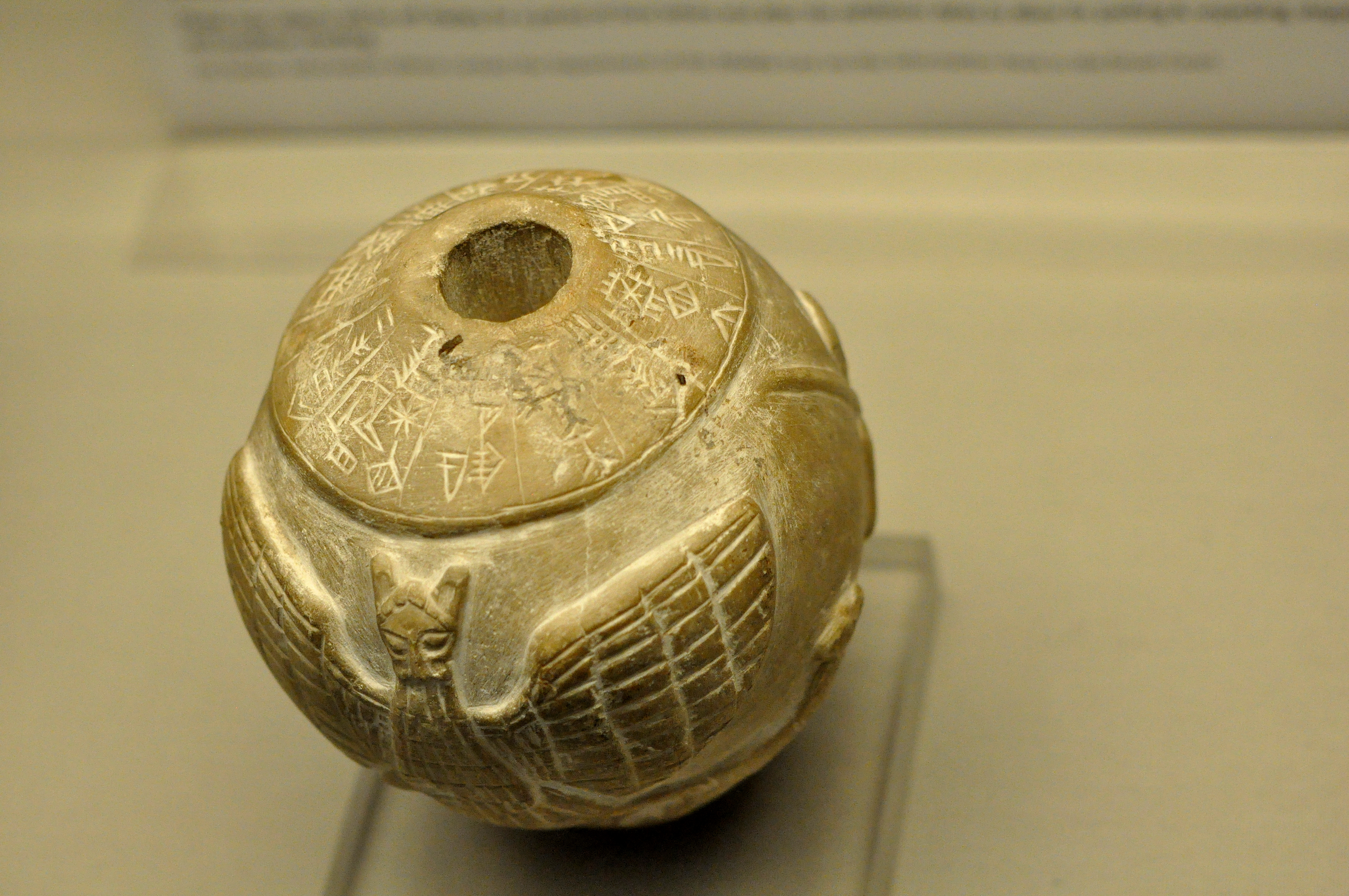
Inscription on the mace head: "For Ningirsu of E-ninnu, the workman of Enannatum, ruler of Lagash, Barakisumun, the sukkal, dedicated this for the life of Enannatum, his Master."

Regnal titles
Preceded by Eannatum	King of Lagash c. 2425 BC	Succeeded by Entemena
