= Ur-Nanshe =

Ur-Nanshe 𒌨𒀭𒀏
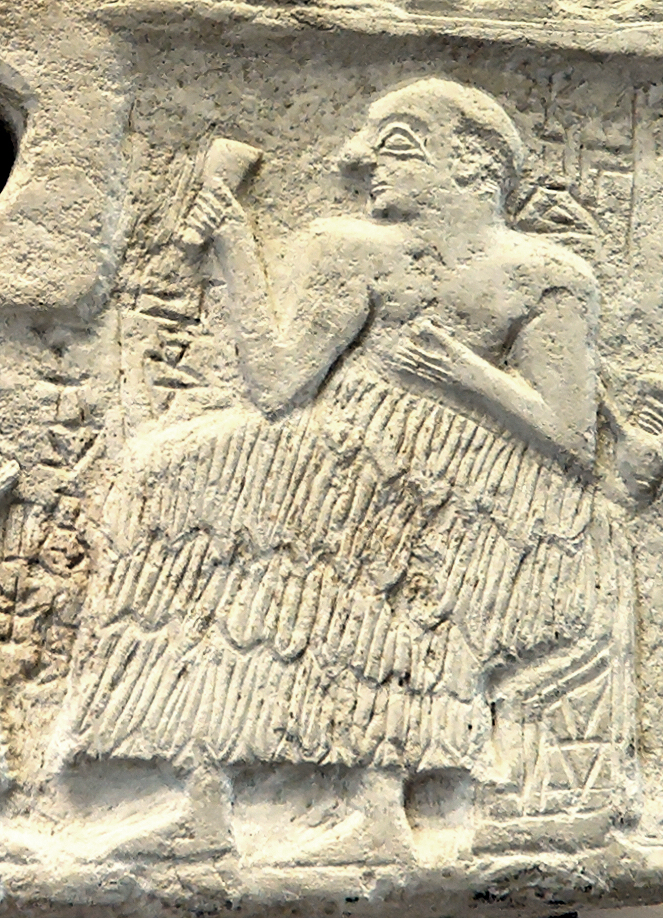
- Ur-Nanshe, seated, wearing flounced skirt. The text to the right of his head reads "Ur-Nanshe" (𒌨𒀭𒀏, UR-NAN). The text in front of him reads "Boats from the land of Dilmun carried the wood" (𒈣𒆳𒋫𒄘𒄑𒈬-𒅅, ma_{2} dilmun kur-ta gu_{2} giš mu-gal_{2}). Limestone, Early Dynastic III (2550–2500 BC). Found in Telloh (ancient city of Girsu). Louvre Museum.

King of Lagash
- Reign: c. 2520 BC
- Predecessor: Possibly Lugal-sha-engur
- Successor: Possibly Akurgal
- Spouse: Possibly Abda; Menbara-abzu
- Issue: Akurgal; Lugal-ezem; Anekura; Mukur...ta; Anunpa; Menusu; Adatur
- Dynasty: 1st Dynasty of Lagash
- Father: Gunidu

Ur-Nanshe (Sumerian: 𒌨𒀭𒀏, UR-NANŠE; fl. c. 2520 BC) also Ur-Nina, was the first king of the First Dynasty of Lagash in the Sumerian Early Dynastic Period III. He is known through inscriptions to have commissioned many building projects, including canals and temples, in the state of Lagash, and defending Lagash from its rival state Umma, whose ensi Pabilgagaltuku he recorded capturing. He was probably not from royal lineage, being the son of Gunidu (𒄖𒉌𒁺) who was recorded without an accompanying royal title. He was the father of Akurgal, who succeeded him, and grandfather of Eannatum. Eannatum expanded the kingdom of Lagash by defeating Umma as illustrated in the Stele of the Vultures and continued the building and renovation of Ur-Nanshe's original buildings.

He ascended after Lugalshaengur (lugal-ša-engur), who was the ensi, or high priest of Lagash, and is only known from the macehead inscription of Mesilim.

== Temples ==
According to the Perforated Relief of King Ur-Nanshe, temples attributed to Ur-Nanshe include Ningirsu's temple in Girsu, Nanshe's temple in Nina, and Apsubanda. He is known to have originally built the Ibgal of Inanna, because of Eanatum's honorary inscriptions left after temple renovation. The Ibgal of Inanna is located in modern-day al-Hiba (ancient city of Lagash). An oval wall surrounds the main mud brick temple and it is located on the southwest edge of the city. This placement within the city is different because temples were usually centrally positioned in ancient Sumer.

== Inscriptions ==
Ur-Nanshe has left behind many inscriptions and plaques that depict him, his family, and court.

=== The Perforated Relief ===
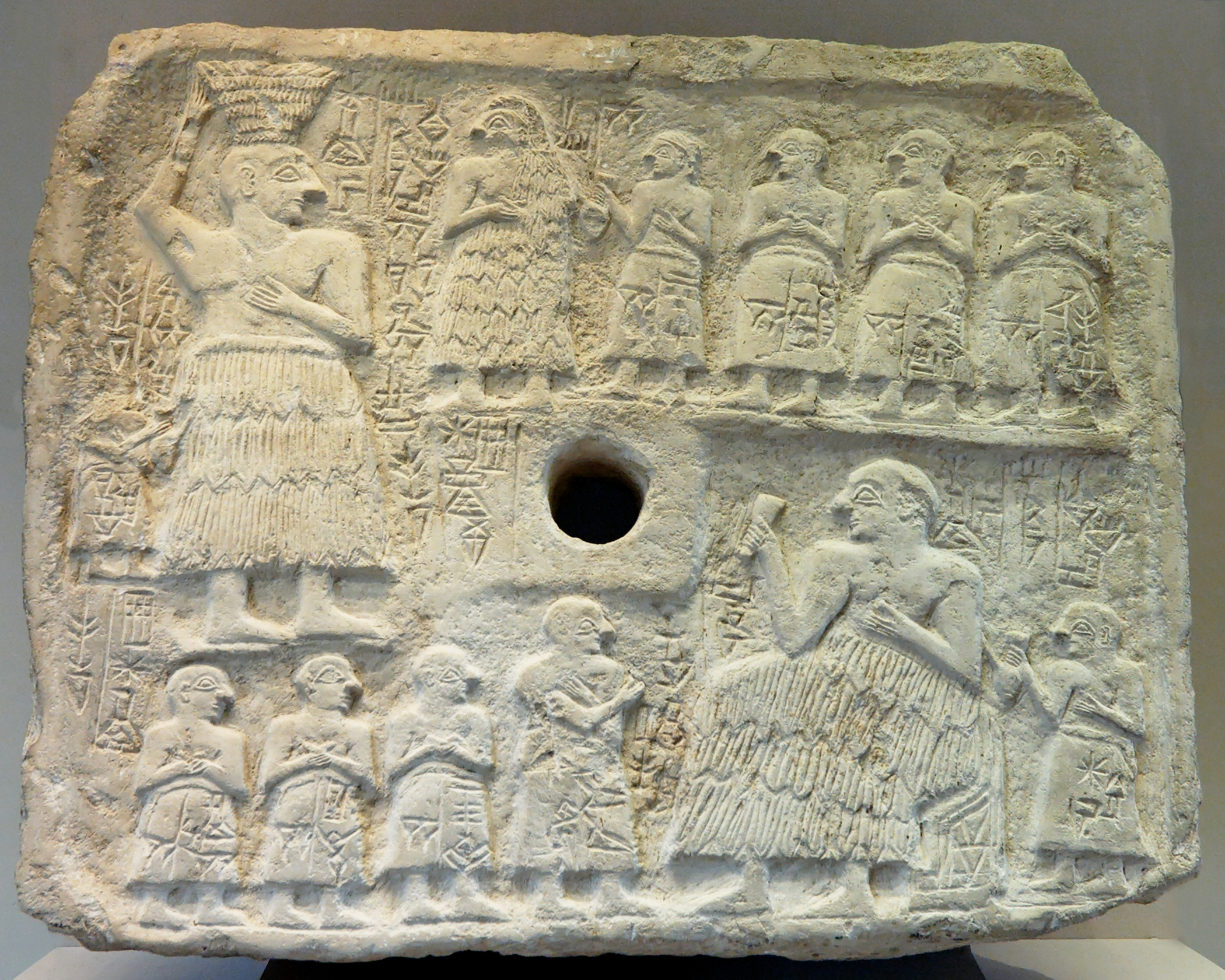
Votive relief of Ur-Nanshe, king of Lagash, with his sons and dignitaries. Limestone, Early Dynastic III (2550–2500 BC). Found in Telloh (ancient city of Girsu) Louvre Museum.

Location of Lagash

The Perforated Relief of King Ur-Nanshe is on display at the Louvre. The king is portrayed as a builder of temples and canals, thus a preserver of order perceived to be bestowed upon them by the gods. It is a perforated limestone slab that was probably part of a wall as a votive decoration and is inscribed in Sumerian:

𒌨𒀭𒀏 / 𒈗 / 𒉢𒁓𒆷 / 𒌉𒄖𒉌𒁺 / 𒌉𒄥𒊬 / 𒂍𒀭𒊩𒌆𒄈𒋢 𒈬𒆕 / 𒍪𒀊𒌉𒁕 𒈬𒆕 / 𒂍𒀭𒀏 𒈬𒆕

Ur-Nanshe / lugal / Lagash / dumu Gunidu / dumu Gurmu/ e2 Ningirsu mu-du3 / abzu-banda3da mu-du3 / e2 ^{D}nanshe mu-du3

“Ur-Nanshe, king of Lagash, son of Gunidu, son of Gurmu, built the temple of Ningirsu, built Apsubanda, built the temple of Nanshe.”

— Dedication inscription of Ur-Nanshe (top left corner)

The carved illustration is in two registers, top and bottom, both depicting Ur-Nanshe in different roles as king. In the top register he is dressed in a kaunakes (tufted wool skirt), carrying a basket of bricks on his head while surrounded by other Lagash elite, his wife, and four of his sons (though it is possible female figure is instead the king's daughter). Inscriptions on their respective garments identify each person. On the bottom register, Ur-Nanshe is at a banquet, which is to celebrate the building of the temple. He is seated on a throne wearing the same outfit as the top register, with two officials either side of him, along with three more of his sons. In both registers Ur-Nanshe is shown using hierarchical proportion in which he is considerably larger than everyone surrounding him.

A part of the inscriptions, in front of the seated king, reads: “Boats from the (distant) land of Dilmun carried the wood (for him)”. This is the oldest known written record of Dilmun and importation of goods into Mesopotamia.

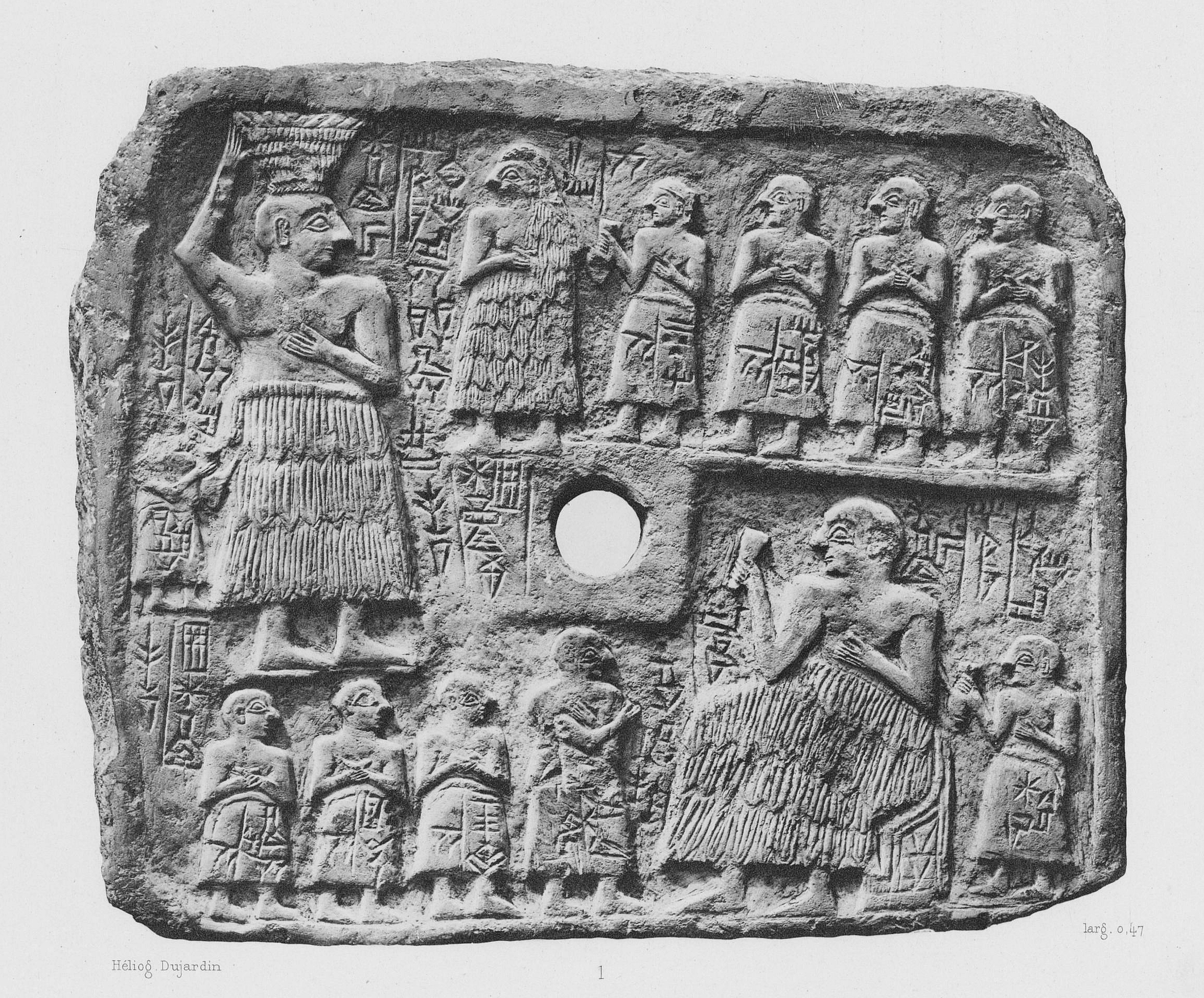
The relief at time of discovery

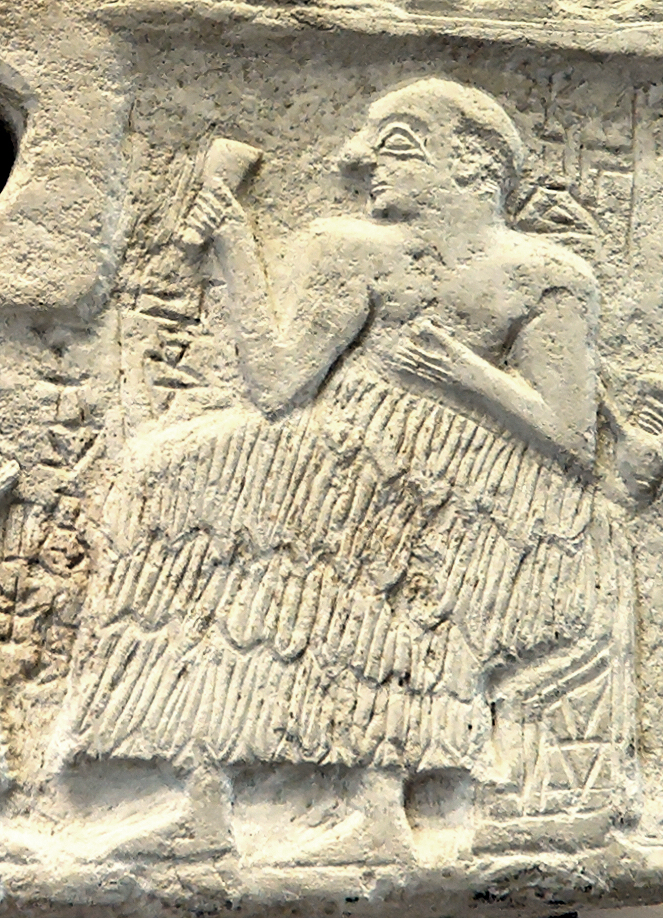
Ur-Nanshe on the relief. He is also depicted wearing a basket for the construction of a temple.

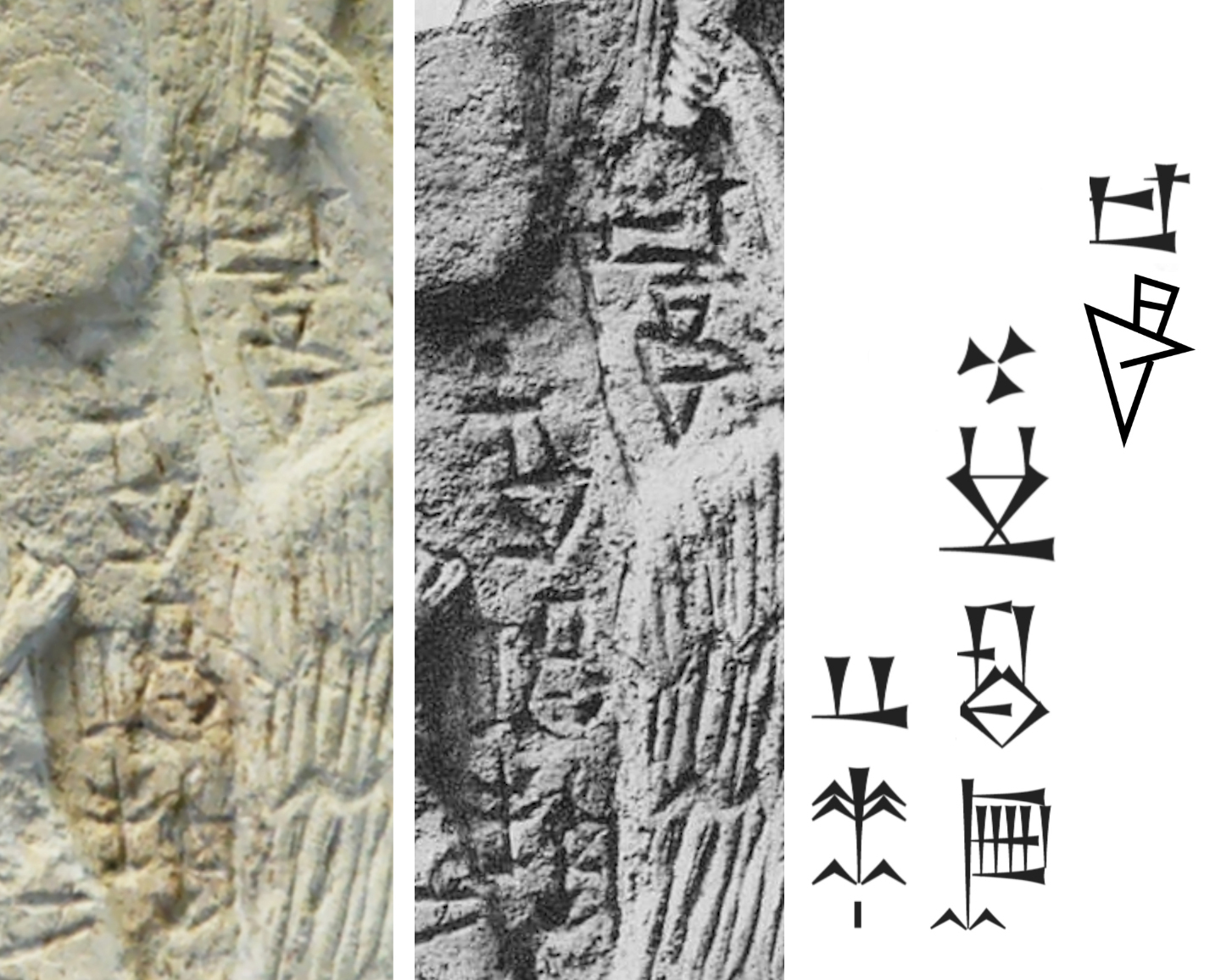
Inscription in front of Ur-Nanshe: "The ships of Dilmun, from the foreign lands, brought him wood as a tribute" (𒈣𒆳𒋫𒄘𒄑𒈬-𒅅, ma_{2} dilmun kur-ta gu_{2} giš mu-gal_{2}).

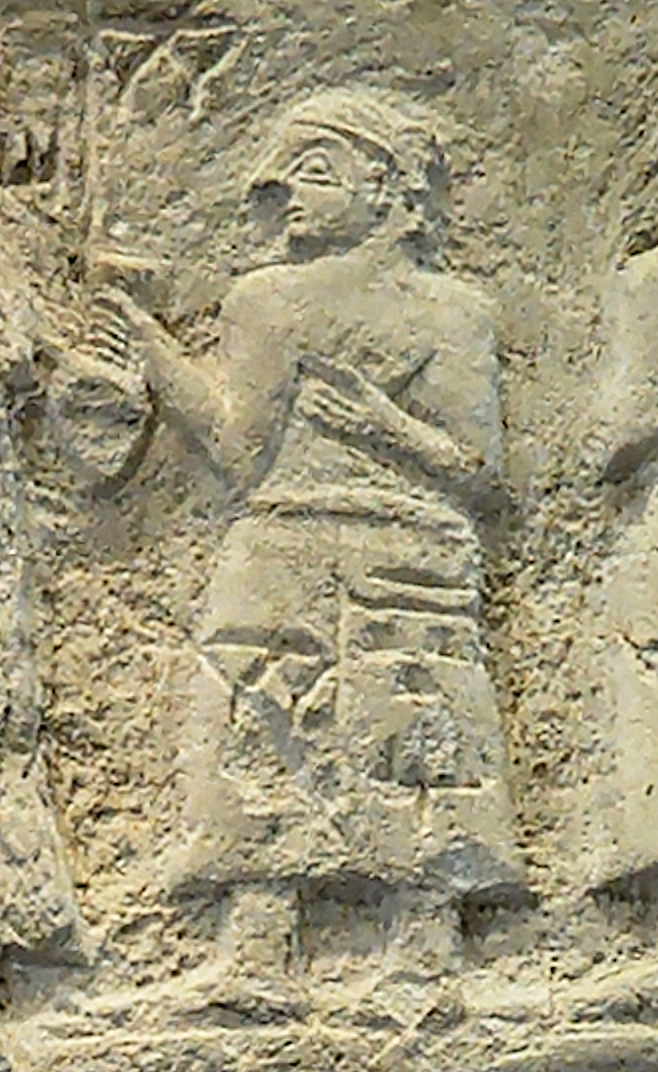
Ur-Nanshe's son Akurgal (𒀀𒆳𒃲) on the relief

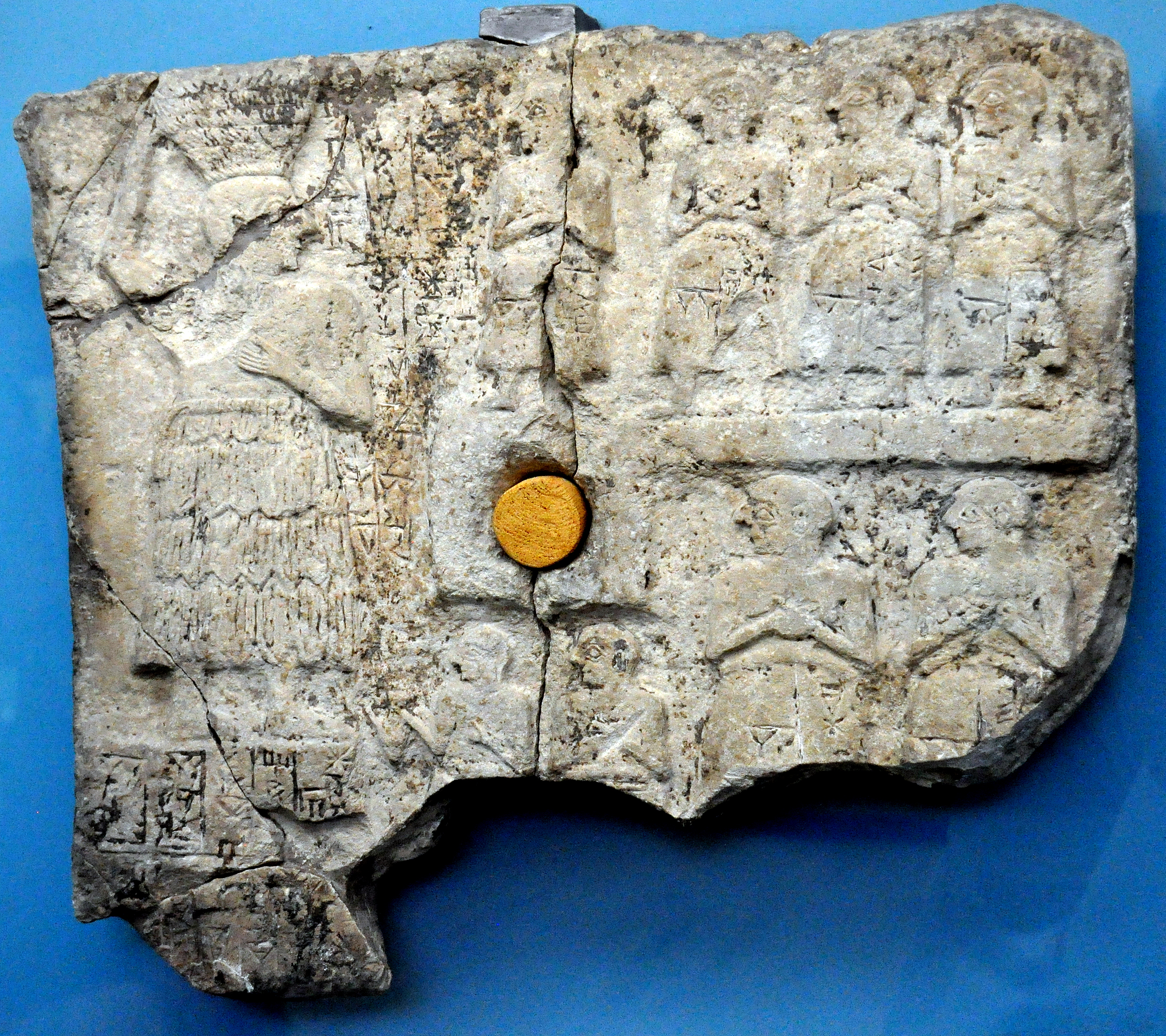
Perforated relief of Ur-Nanshe at the Ancient Orient Museum, Istanbul, Turkey. Very similar to the Louvre's plaque. From Girsu, Iraq

=== Door socket ===
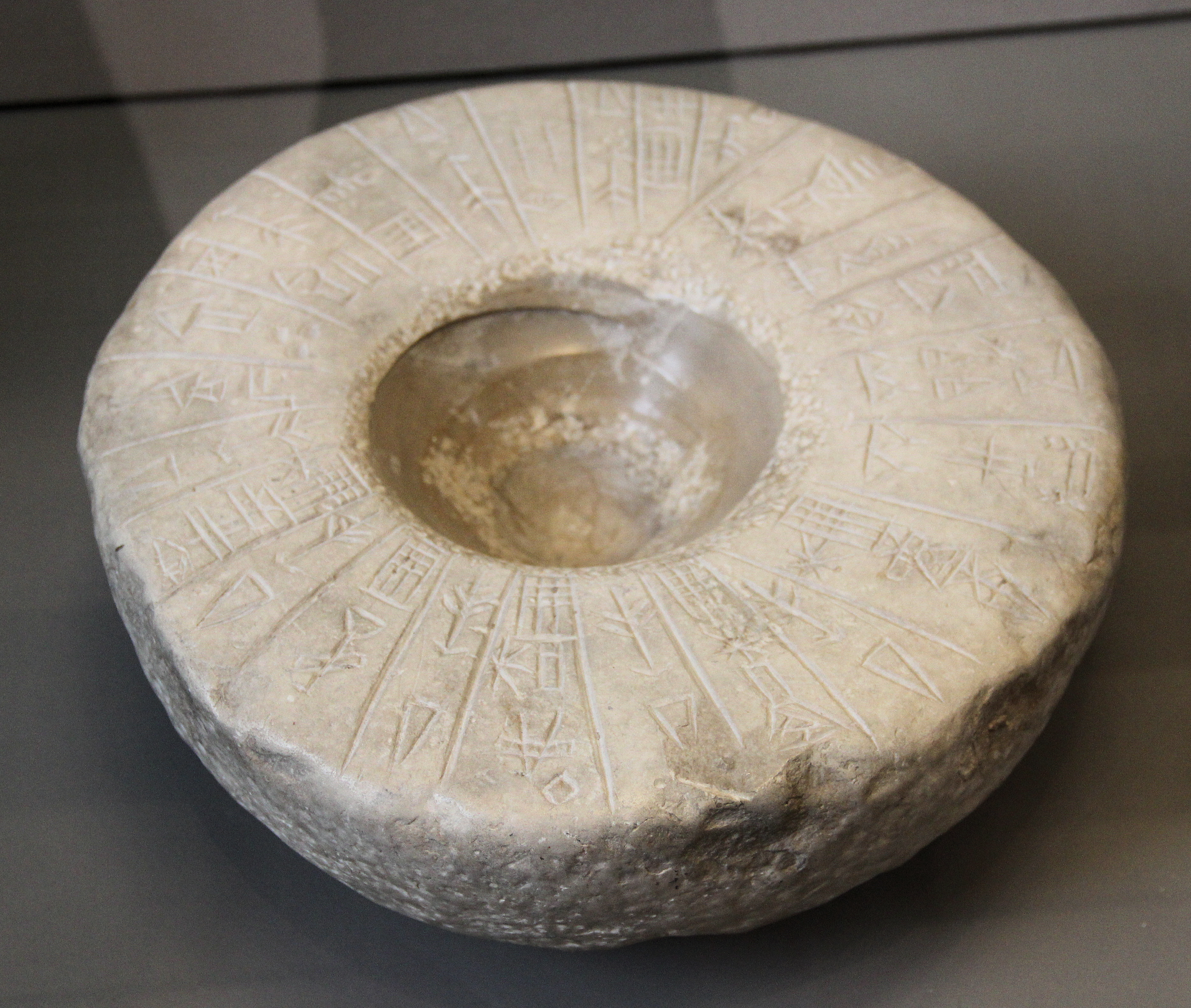
Ur-Nanshe door socket with inscription: "Ur-Nanshe, King of Lagash, son of Gunidu, the son of Gurmu..." and a list of the temples he built. Louvre Museum.

An inscribed door socket from Ur-Nanshe is also known, now in the Louvre Museum. The full inscription of the door socket has been translated as:

"Ur-Nanshe, the king of Lagash, the son of Gunidu, the son of Gurmu, built the house of Ningirsu; built the house of Nanshe; built the house of Gatumdug; built the harem; built the house of Ninmar. The ships of Dilmun brought him wood as a tribute from foreign lands. He built the Ibgal; built the Kinir; built the scepter (?)-house."

— Inscription on the perforated relief of Ur-Nanshe.

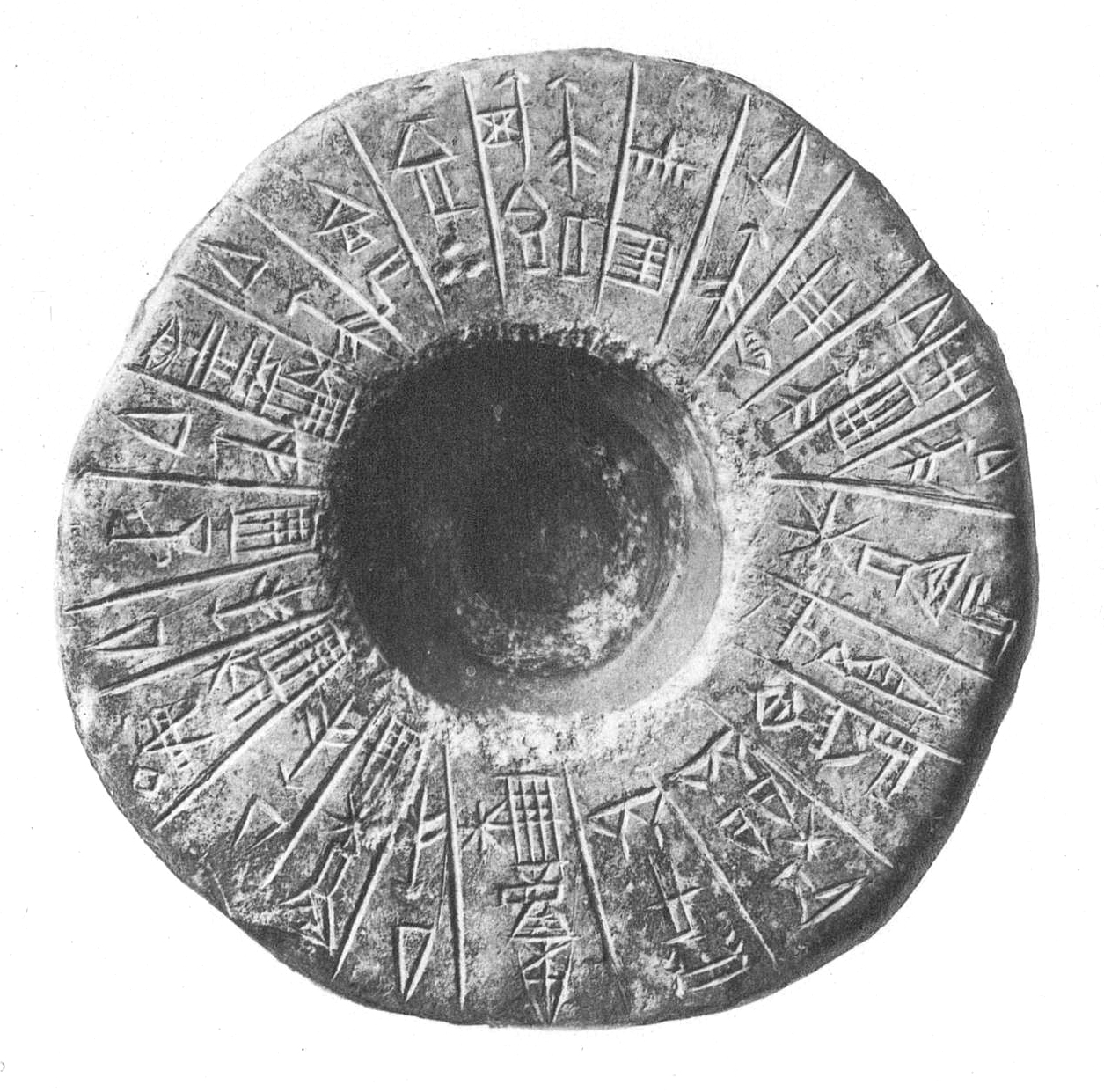
The door socket of Ur-Nanshe at the time of discovery

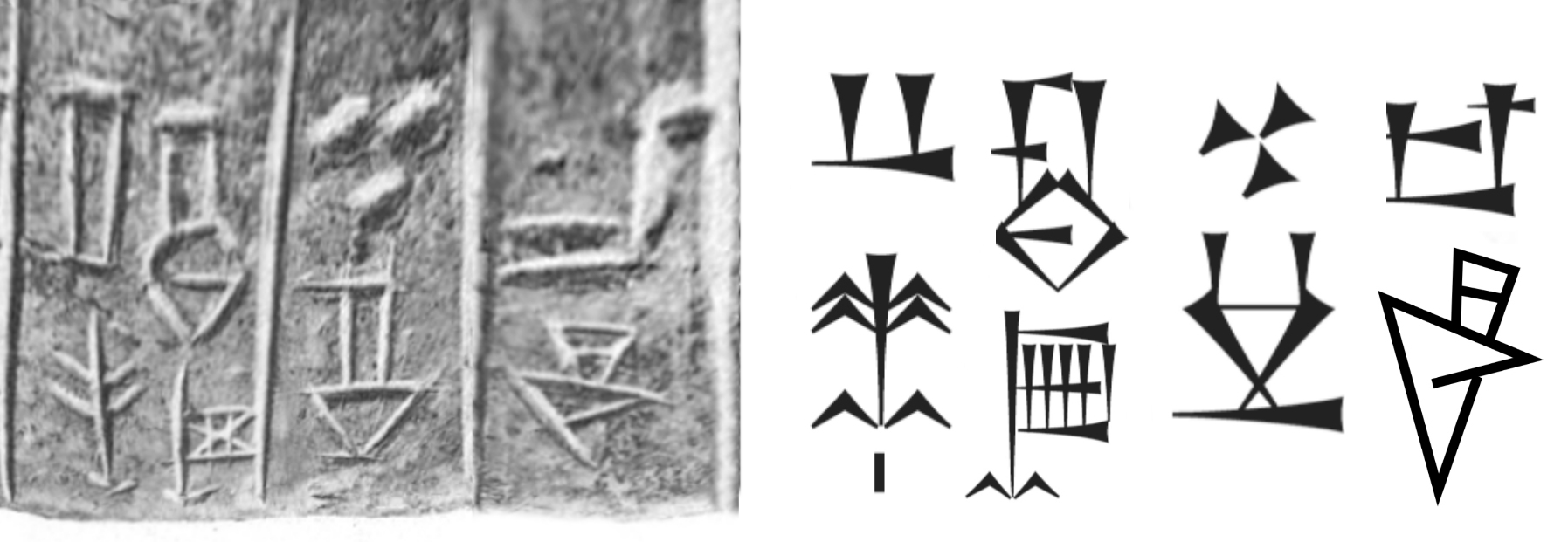
"The ships of Dilmun, from the foreign lands, brought him (Ur-Nanshe) wood as a tribute (?)" (𒈣𒆳𒋫𒄘𒄑𒈬-𒅅, ma_{2} dilmun kur-ta gu_{2} giš mu-gal_{2}). Door socket of Ur-Nanshe.

=== The Plaque of Ur Nanshe ===
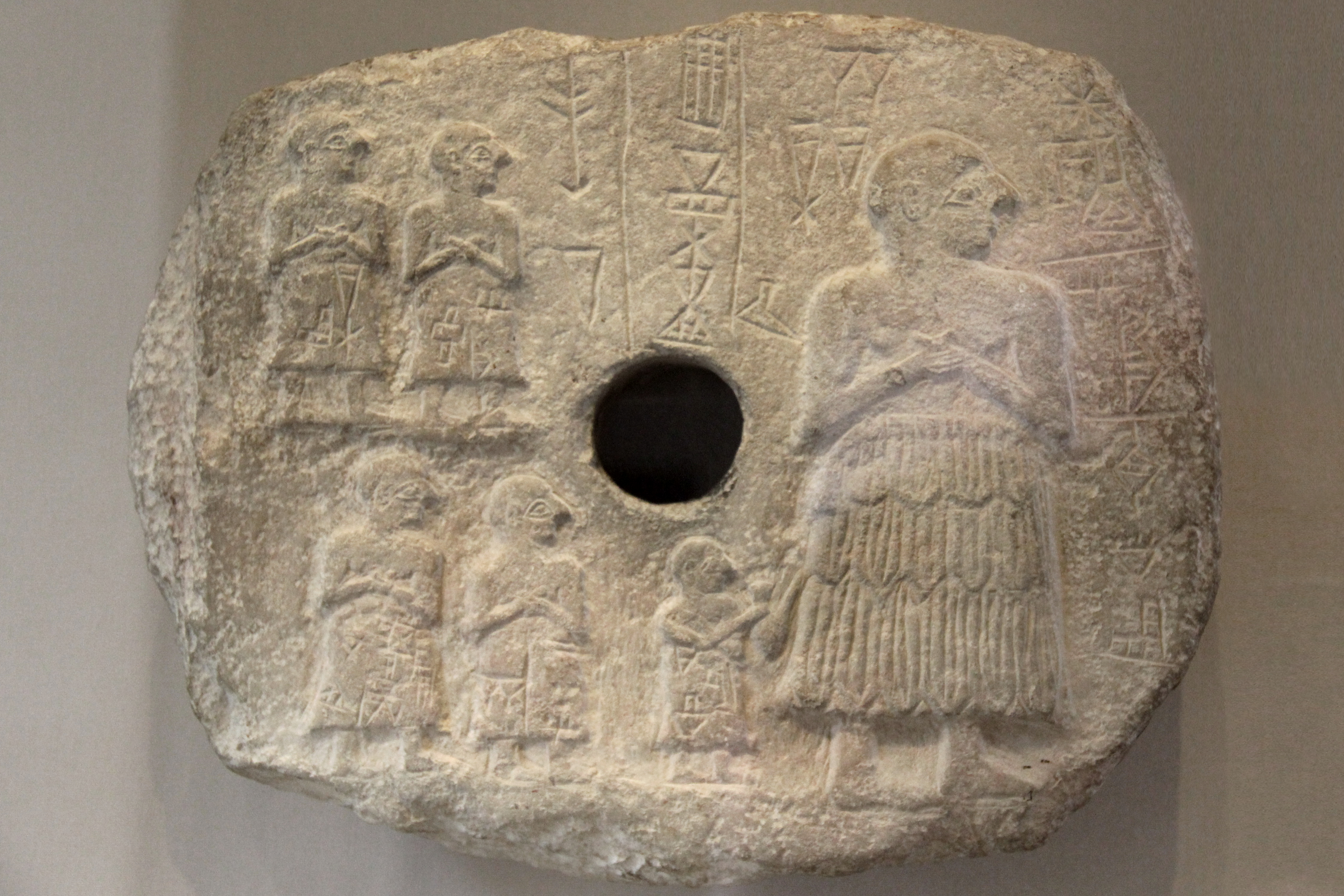
Plaque of Ur-Nanshe, King of Lagash, with his sons and a cup bearer. Louvre Museum.

The Plaque of Ur Nanshe is a limestone plaque currently located at the Louvre Museum that honors Ur Nanshe. The figures displayed are the king and his court standing rigid and wide eyed, paying homage to the god Nanshe. They are dressed in kaunakes with their hands clasped together over their chest. Hierarchical scale of the king and the use of cuneiform on the figures to identify them are employed as in the Perforated Relief.

𒌨𒀭𒀏 / 𒈗 / 𒉢𒁓𒆷 / 𒌉𒄖𒉌𒁺 / 𒂍𒀭𒊩𒌆𒄈𒋢 / 𒈬𒆕

Ur-Nanshe / lugal / Lagash / dumu Gunidu / E-Ningirsu / mudu

"Ur-Nanshe, king of Lagash, son of Gunidu, built the temple of Ningirsu"

— Inscription on the plaque of Ur-Nanshe. Louvre Museum.

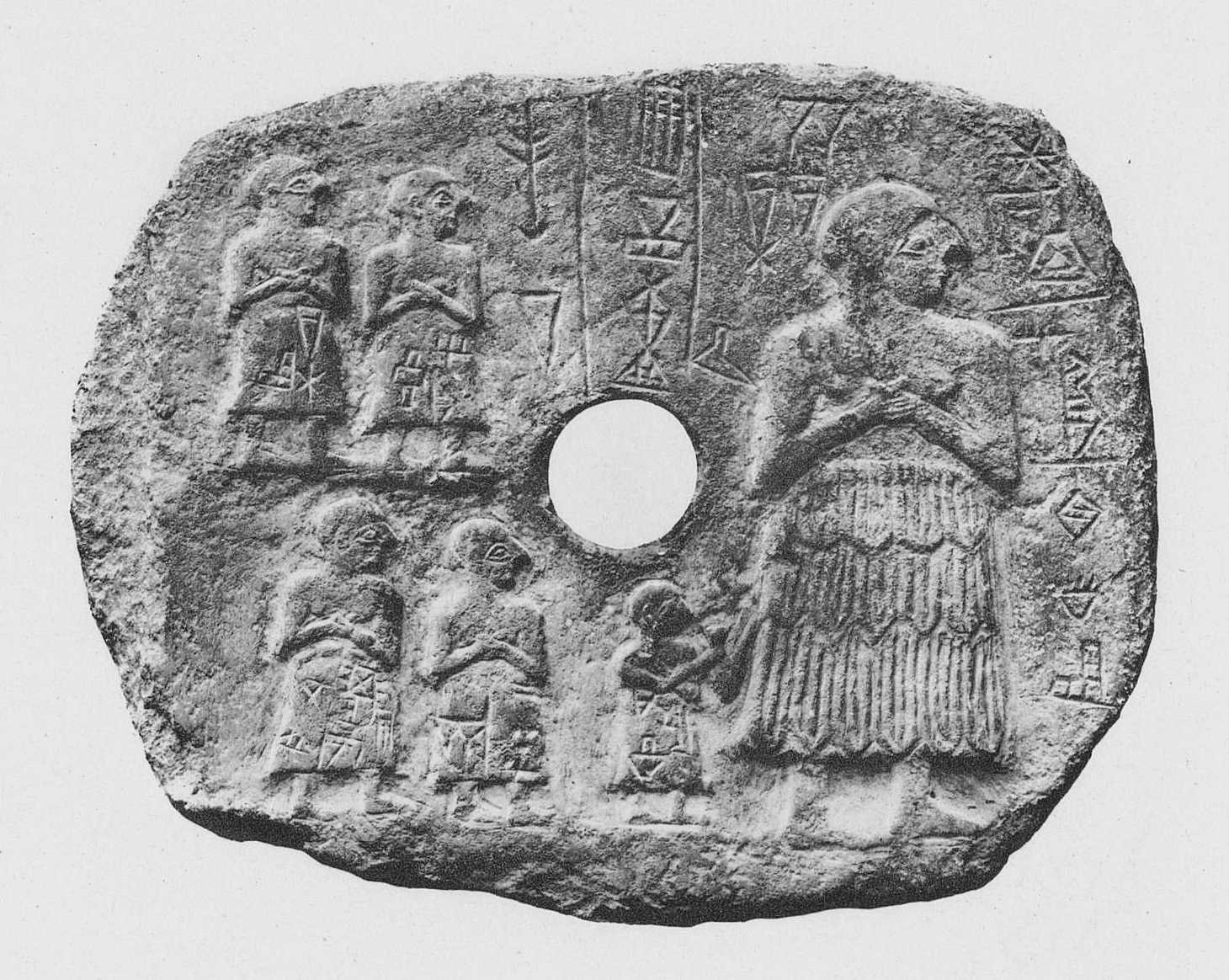
Plaque of Ur-Nanshe at time of discovery

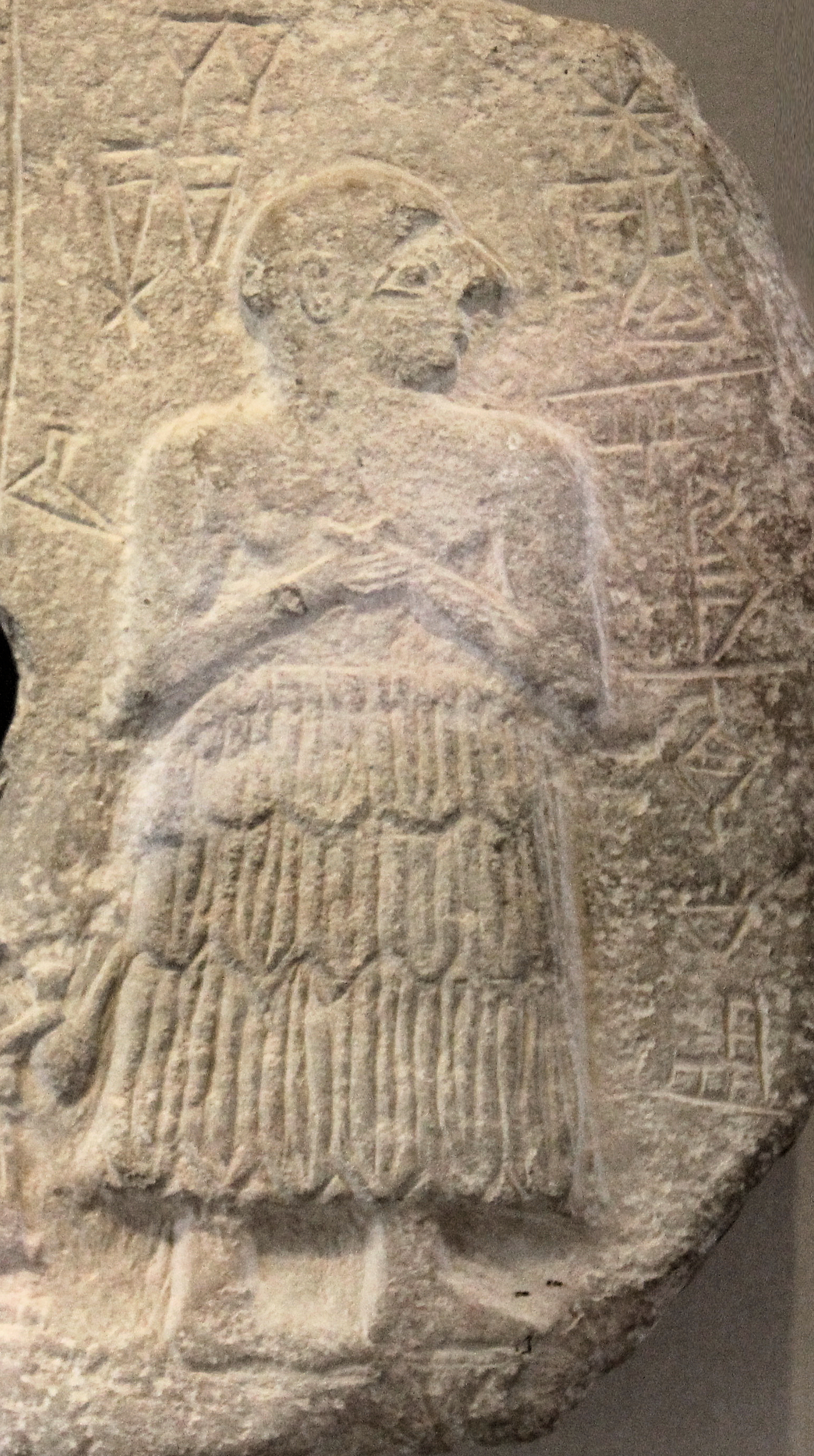
Ur-Nanshe himself

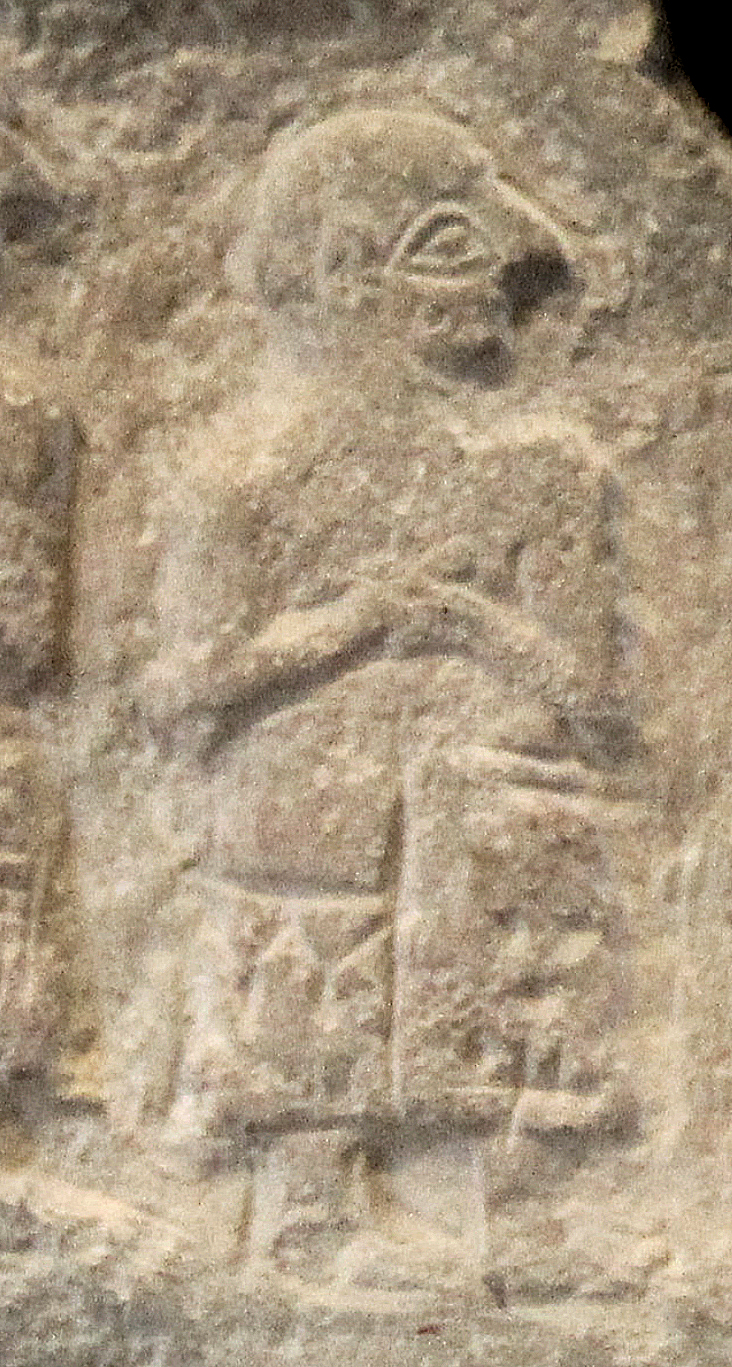
Akurgal (𒀀𒆳𒃲) as a child in the limestone votive relief of Ur-Nanshe

==== Additional inscriptions ====
Ur-Nanshe inscription

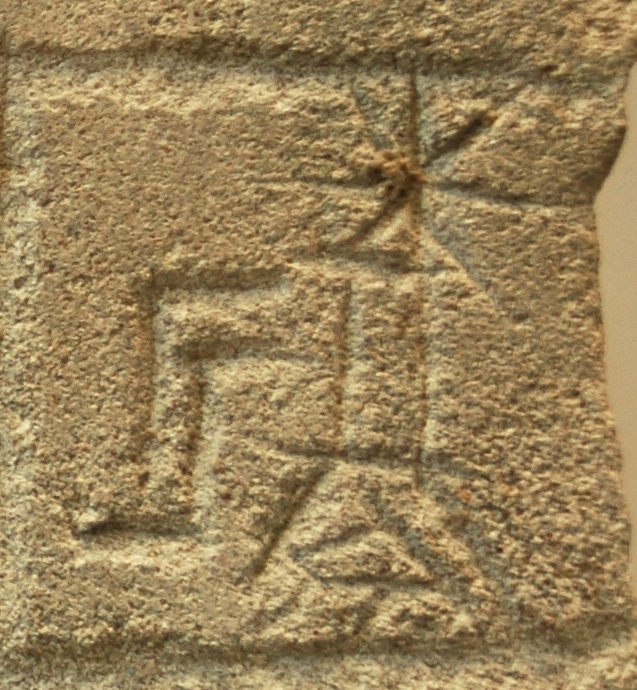
"Ur-Nanshe"
𒌨𒀭𒀏

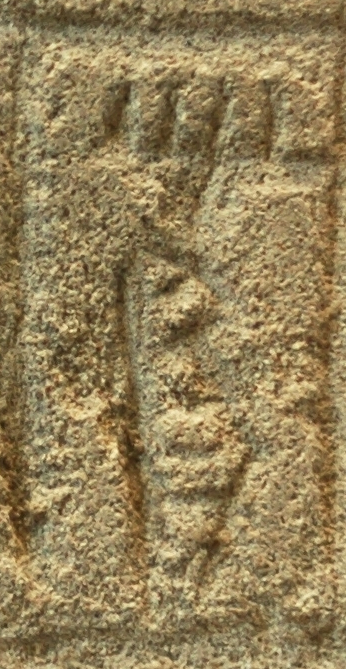
King of
𒈗

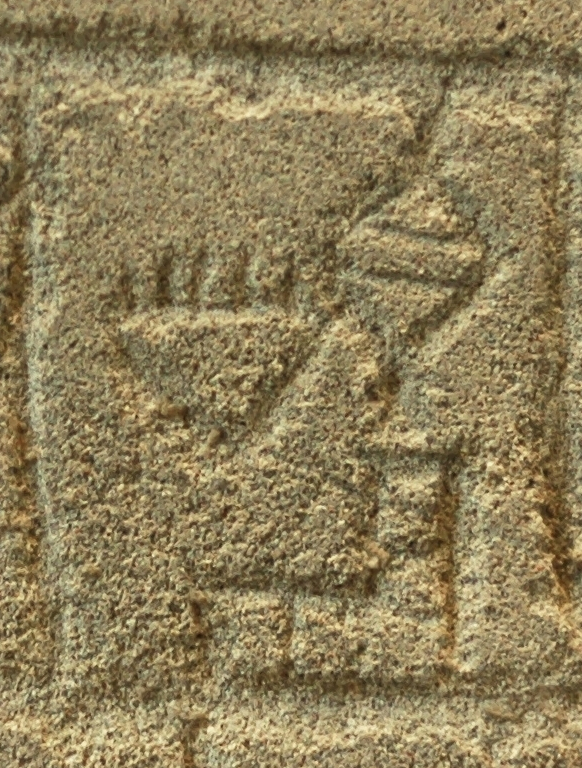
"Lagash"
𒉢𒁓𒆷

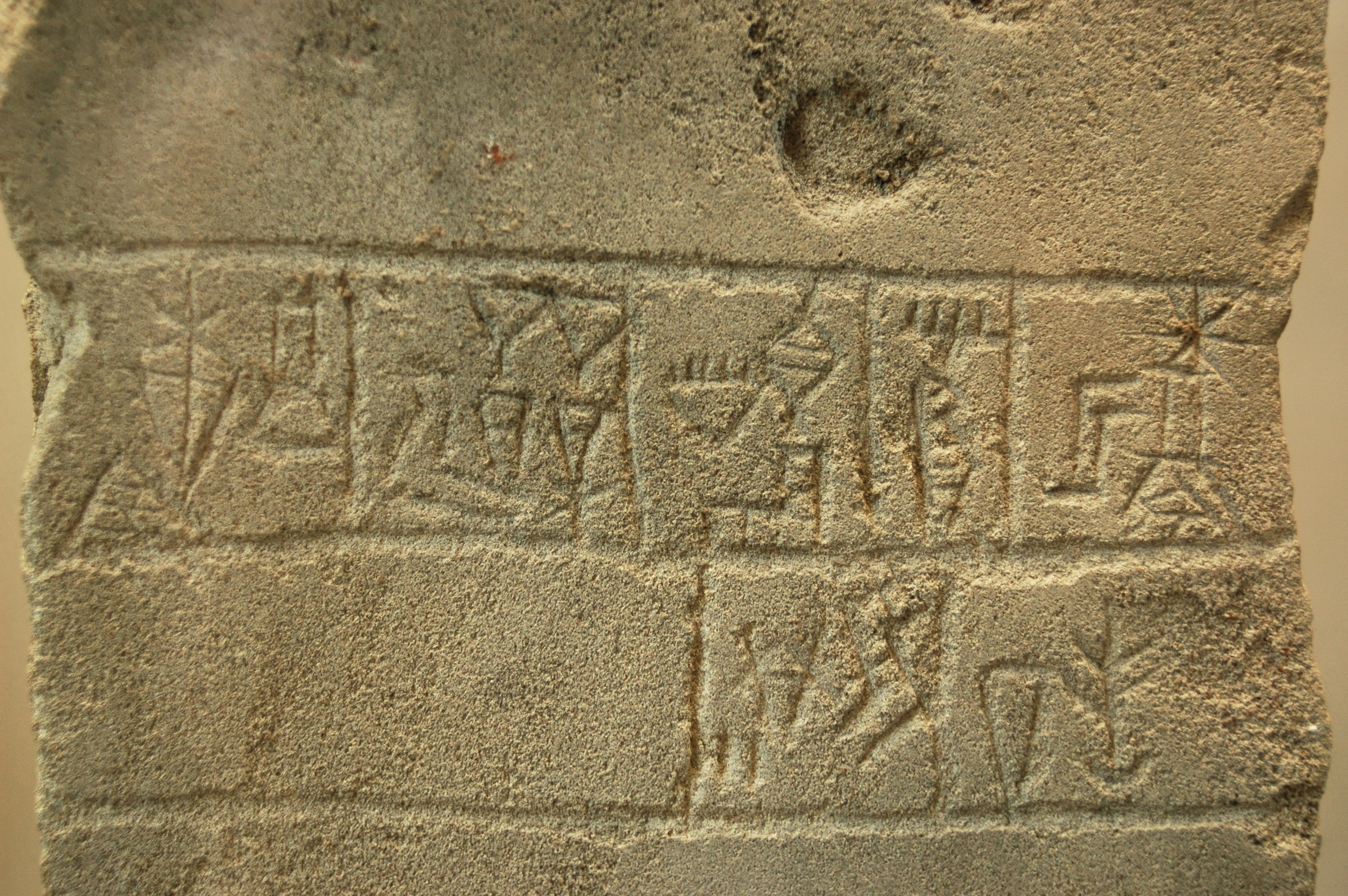
Fragmentary stele bearing from right to left the inscription "Ur-Nanshe/ King of/ Lagash/ son of Gunidu/ to Ningirsu..." (Louvre)

There are many other inscriptions found by or mentioning Ur-Nanshe. Some of them include a listing of rulers of Lagash and a hymn to Nanshe.

Excerpt from Ruler of Lagash:

“Ur-Nanše, the son of ......, who built the E-Sirara, her temple of happiness and Niĝin, her beloved city, acted for 1080 years. Ane-tum, the son of Ur-Nanše”

Excerpt from A Hymn to Nanshe:

“There is perfection in the presence of the lady. Lagaš thrives in abundance in the presence of Nanše. She chose the šennu in her holy heart and seated Ur-Nanše, the beloved lord of Lagaš, on the throne. She gave the lofty scepter to the shepherd.”

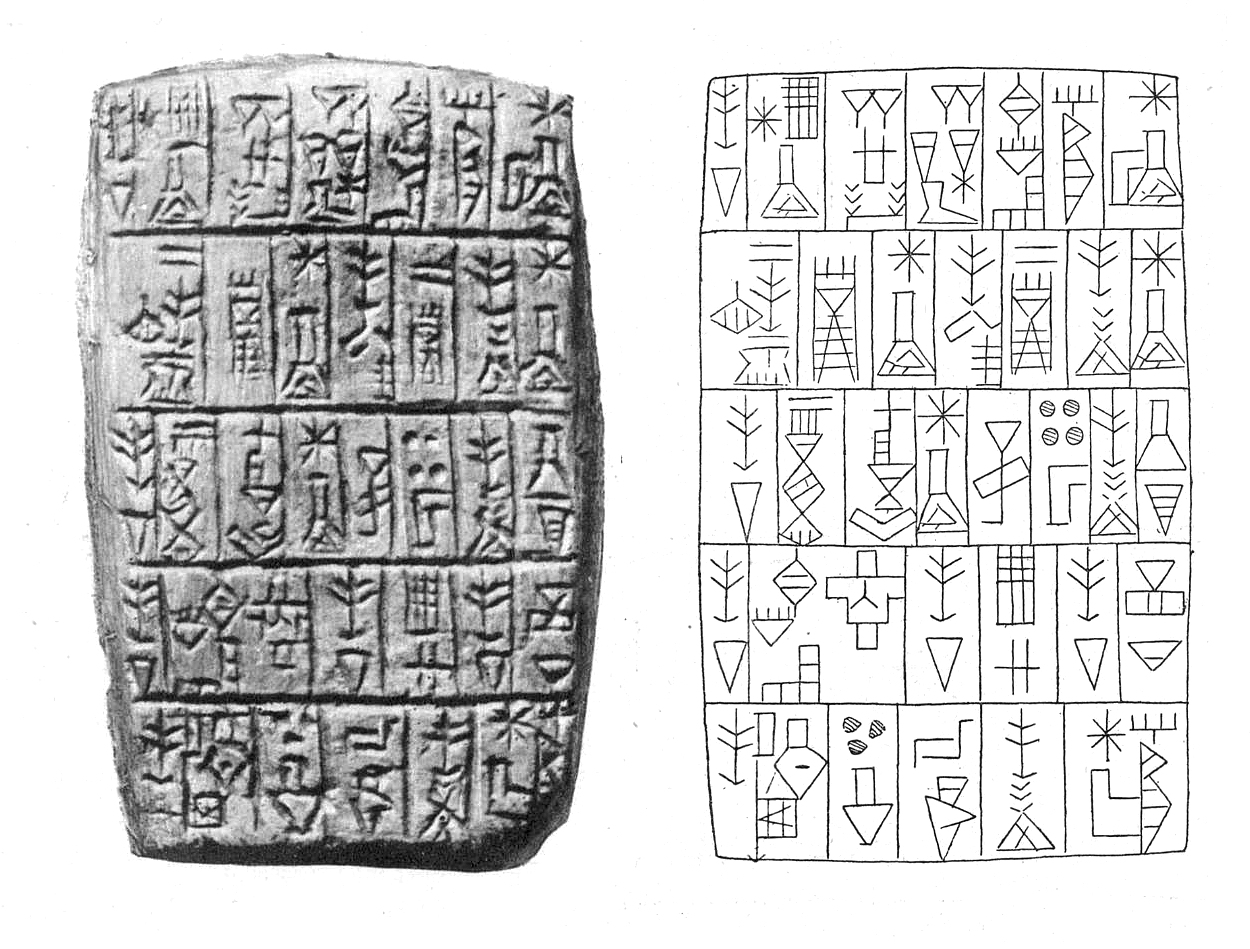
Tablet of Ur-Nanshe (Urn 24): "Ur-Nanshe, King of Lagash, son of Gunidu, the son of Gurmu, built the house of Nanshe, fashioned (the statue of) Nanshe (...) Boats from the land of Dilmun carried the wood".

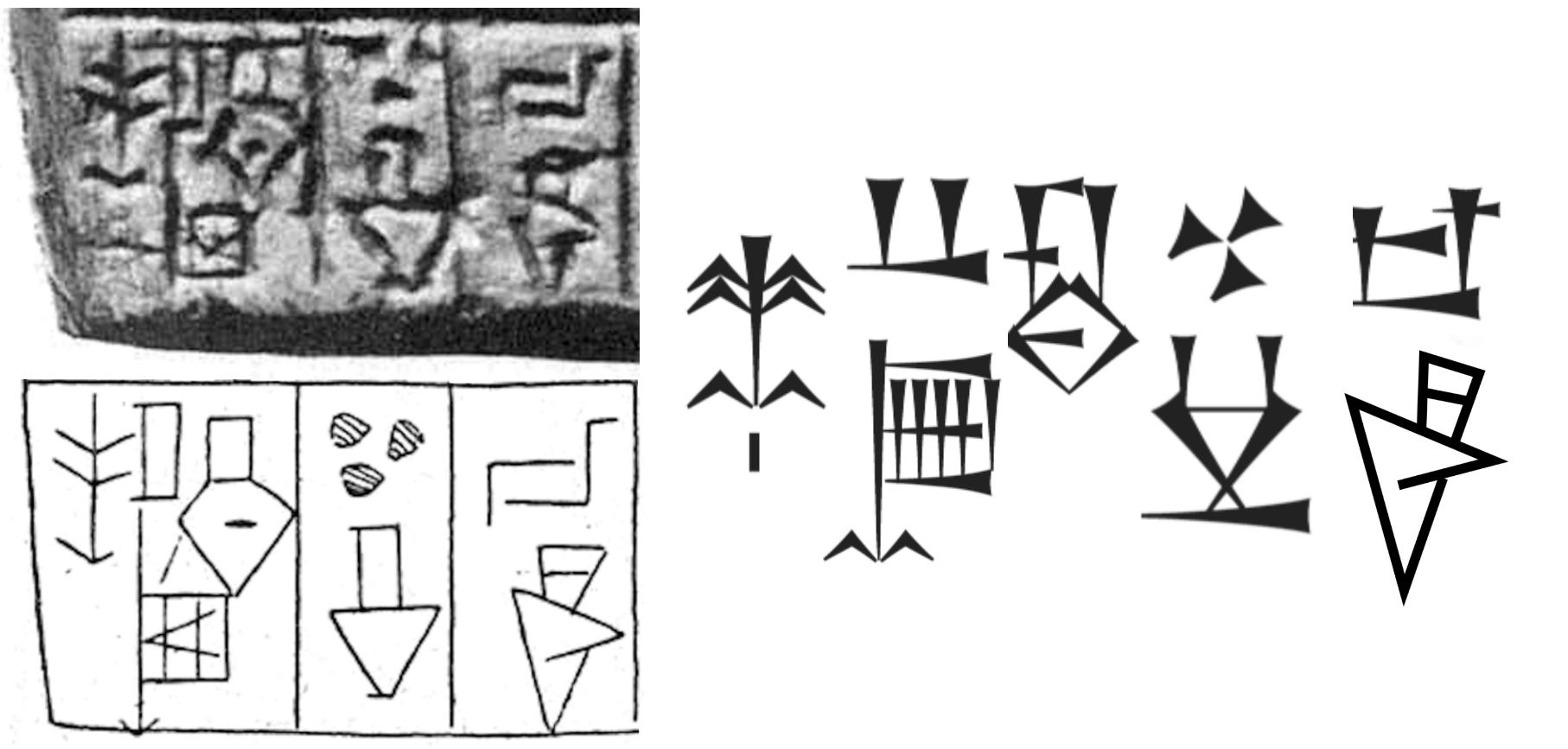
"The ships of Dilmun, from the foreign lands, brought him (Ur-Nanshe) wood as a tribute (?)" (𒈣𒆳𒋫𒄘𒄑𒈬-𒅅, ma_{2} dilmun kur-ta gu_{2} giš mu-gal_{2}). Tablet of Ur-Nanshe (Urn 24).

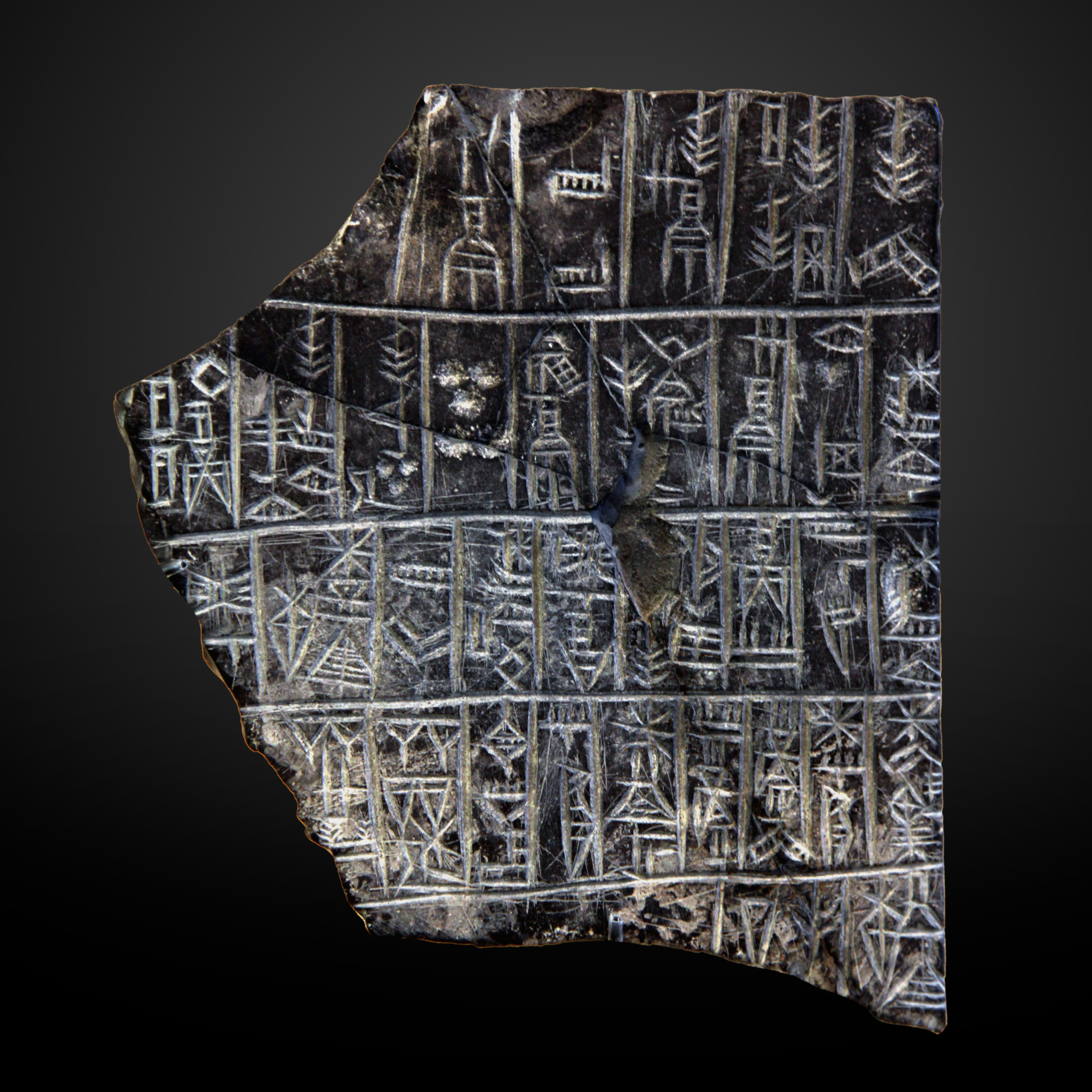
Inscription in the name of Ur-Nanshe, an incantation to the reed and to Enki, before the foundation of the Girsu sanctuary for god Ningirsu.

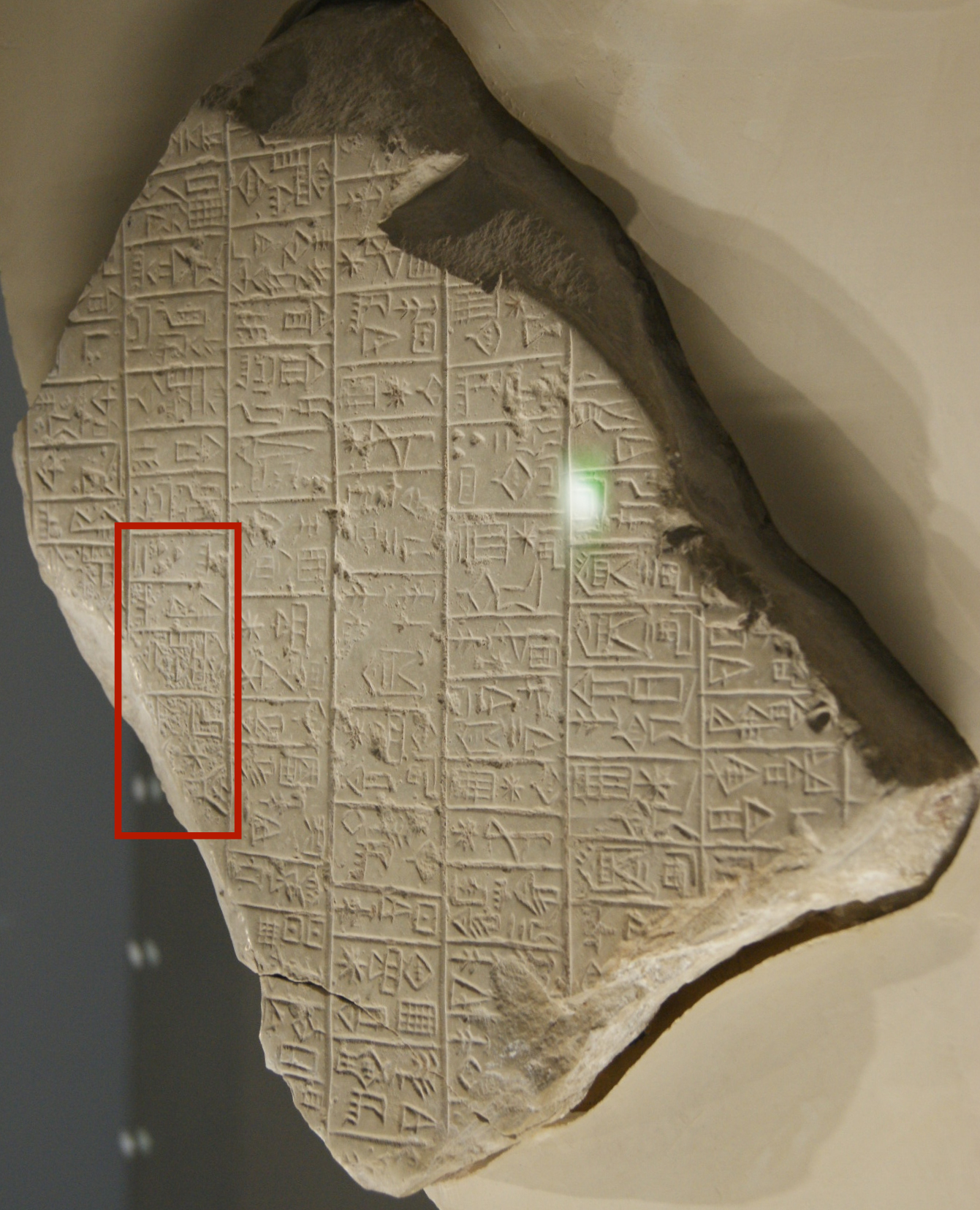
"Akurgal king of Lagash, son of Ur-Nanshe" (𒀀𒆳𒃲 𒈗 𒉢𒁓𒆷𒆠 𒌉 𒌨𒀭𒀏) on the Stele of the Vultures

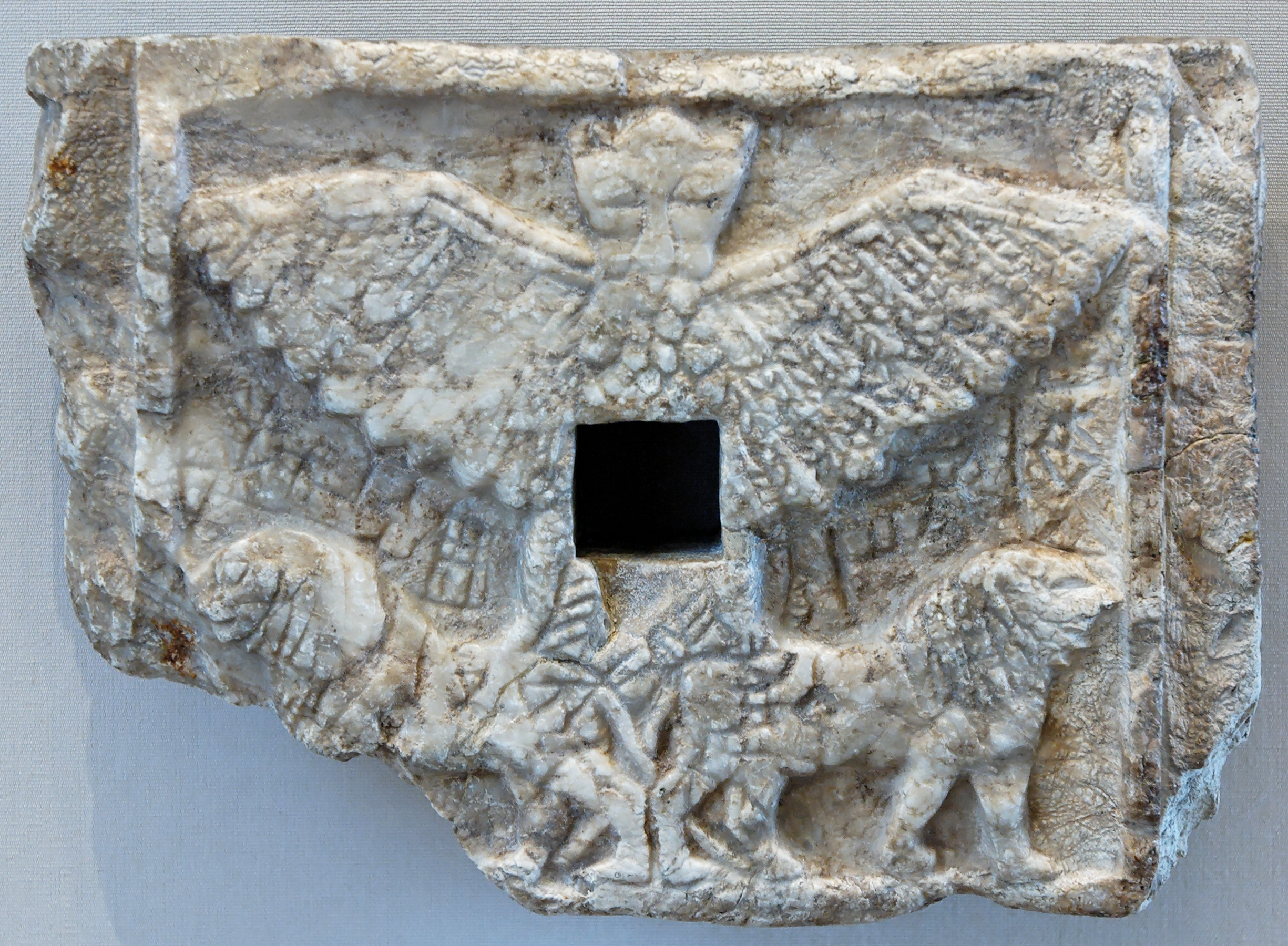
Votive relief of Ur-Nanshe, king of Lagash, representing the bird-god Anzû (or Im-dugud) as a lion-headed eagle. Alabaster, Early Dynastic III (2550–2500 BC). Found in Telloh, ancient city of Girsu.Now in the Louvre.

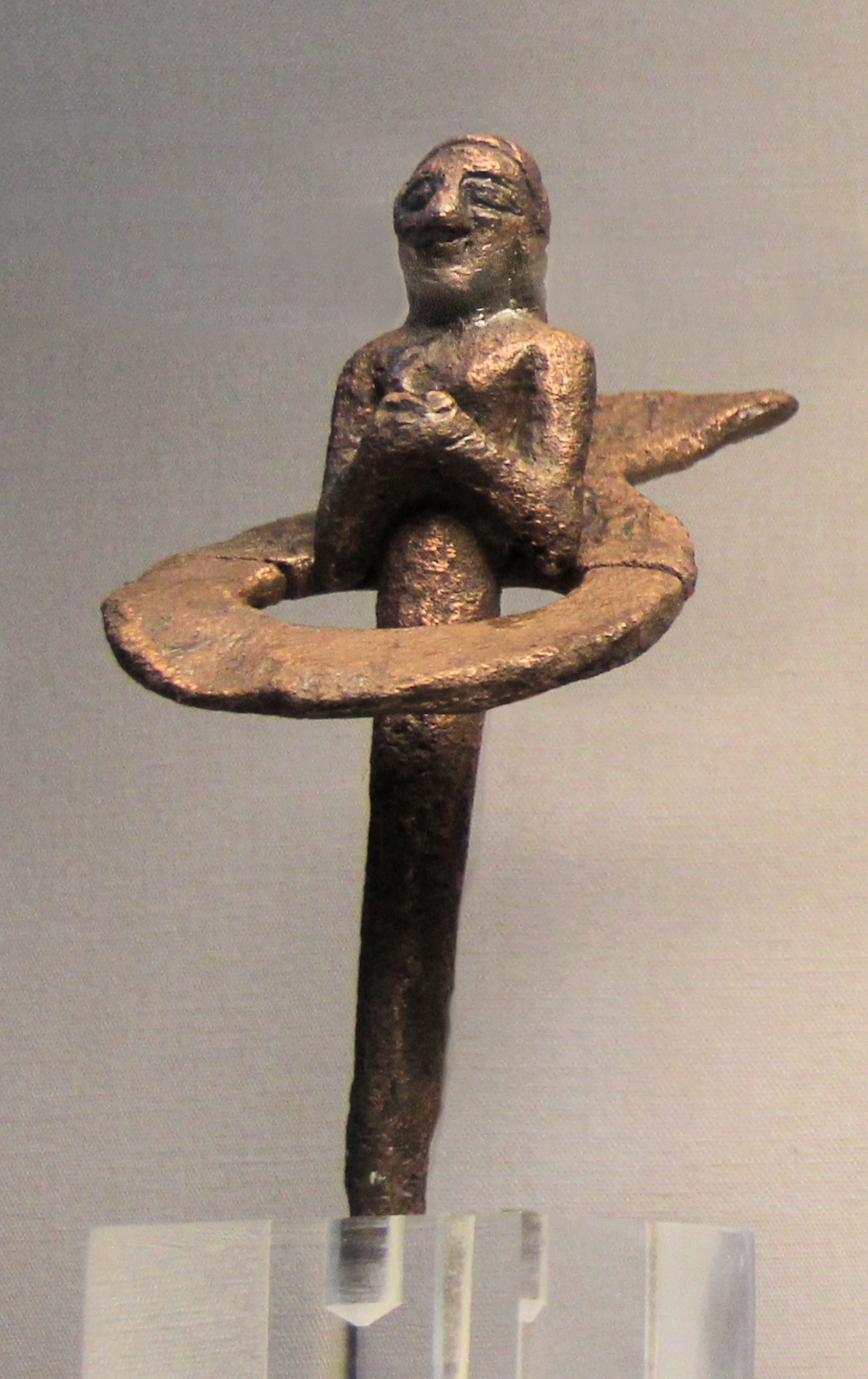
Temple foundation figurine in the name of Ur-Nanshe. Inscription "Ur-Nanshe, King of Lagash, has built the shrine of Girsu". British Museum, BM 96565.

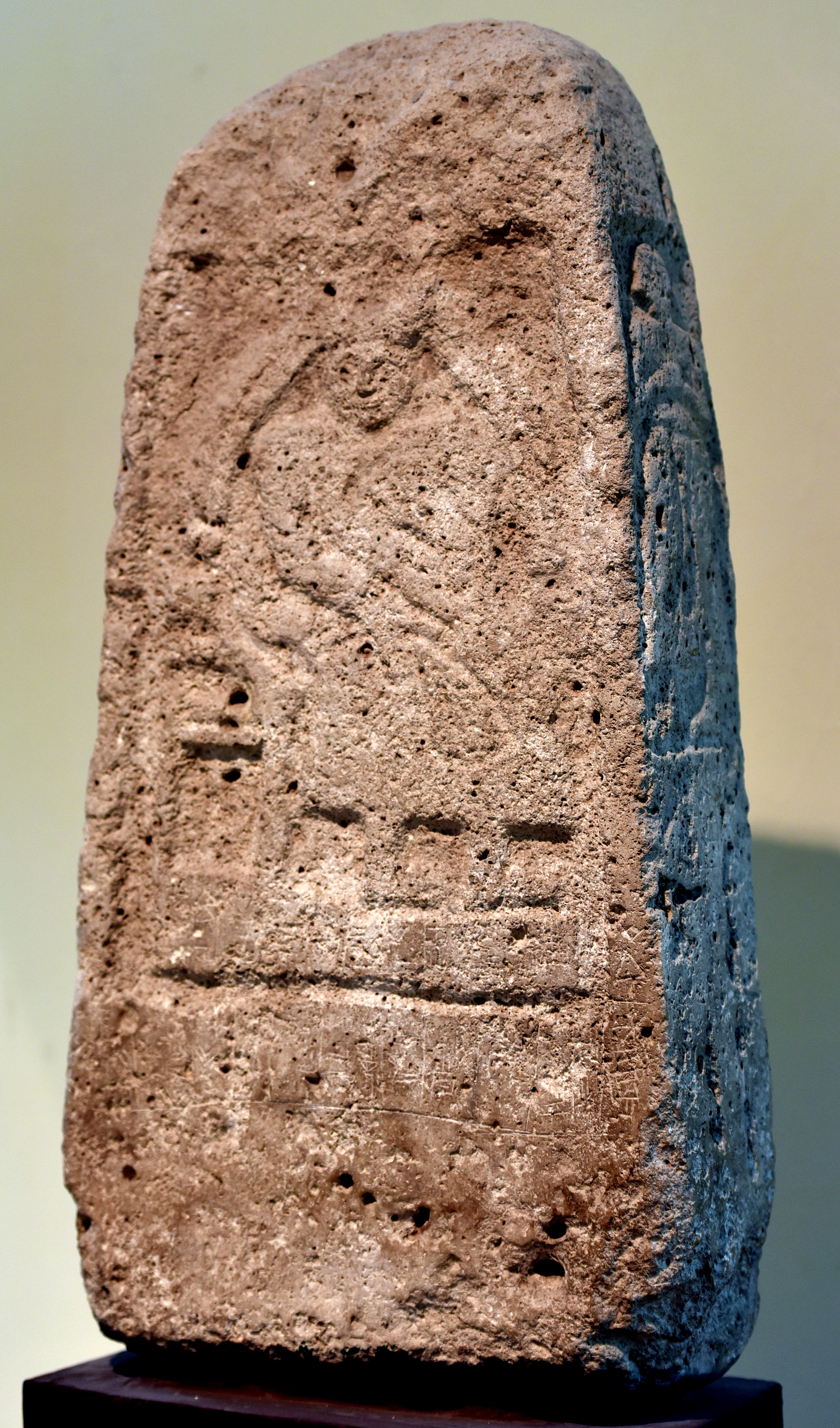
Stele of Ur-Nanshe with goddess Nisaba, ruler of Lagash, from Lagash, Iraq, 26th century BCE. Iraq Museum.

== See also ==
- History of Sumer
- Chronology of the ancient Near East

Regnal titles
Preceded by Possibly Lugalshaengur	King of Lagash c. 2520 BC	Succeeded by Possibly Akurgal
