= Akurgal =

Akurgal 𒀀𒆳𒃲
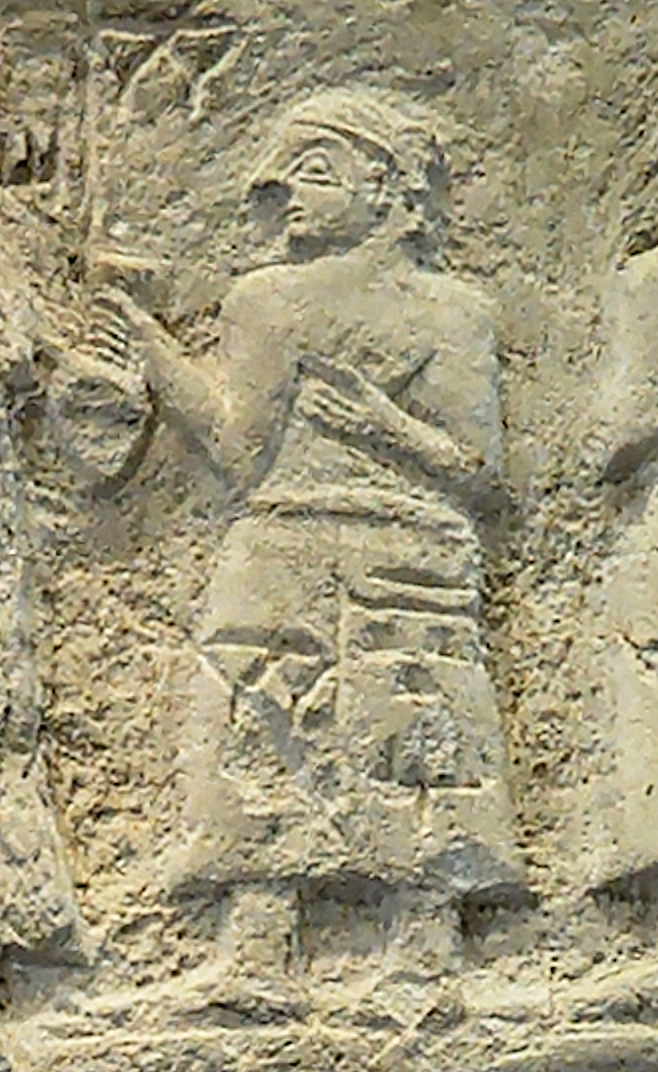
- Akurgal as son of Ur-Nanshe, on the votive relief of Ur-Nanshe. The name of Akurgal (𒀀𒆳𒃲) appears on the skirt, vertically. The character next to it to the left is 𒌉, dumu, for "child", "son". Louvre Museum

King of Lagash
- Reign: c. 2460 BC
- Predecessor: Possibly Ur-Nanshe
- Successor: Possibly Eannatum
- Issue: Eannatum; Enannatum I
- Dynasty: 1st Dynasty of Lagash
- Father: Ur-Nanshe

Location of Lagash

Akurgal (Sumerian: 𒀀𒆳𒃲, "Descendant of the Great Mountain" in Sumerian; fl. c. 2460 BC) was the second king (Ensi) of the first dynasty of Lagash. His relatively short reign took place in the first part of the 25th century BCE, during the period of the archaic dynasties. He succeeded his father, Ur-Nanshe, founder of the dynasty, and was replaced by his son Eannatum.

Very little is known about his reign: only six inscriptions mention it. One of them reports that he built the Antasura of Ningirsu.

During his reign, a border conflict pitted Lagash against Umma, These borders between Umma and Lagash had been fixed in ancient times by Mesilim, king (lugal) of Kish, who had drawn the borders between the two states in accordance with the oracle of Ishtaran, invoked as intercessor between the two cities. Akurgal is mentioned fragmentally in an inscription on the Stele of the Vultures, describing the conflict of Akurgal with Lagash, possibly with Ush, king of Umma: "Because of […] the man of Umma spoke arrogantly with him and defied Lagash. Akurgal, king of Lagash, son of Urnanshe […]". In all likelihood Akurgal lost part of the territory of Lagash to the ruler of Umma.

He had two sons, who both became important rulers of Lagash after him, Eannatum and Enannatum I, and successfully repelled Umma's encroachment.

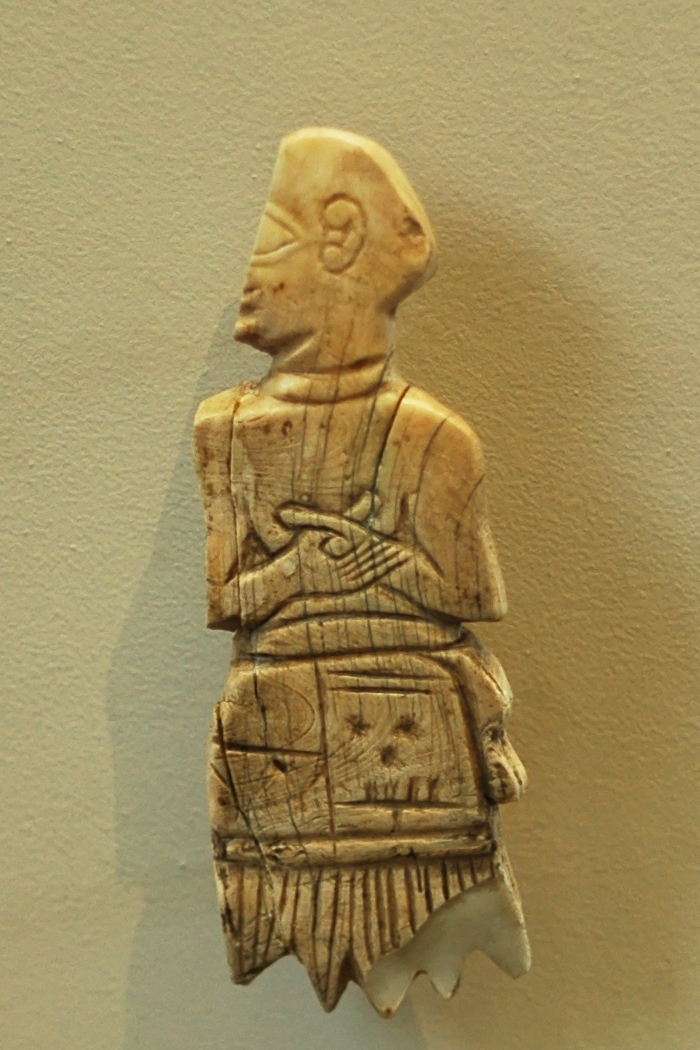
Shell inlay in the name of Akurgal (on the skirt, vertically), found in Girsu. Louvre Museum

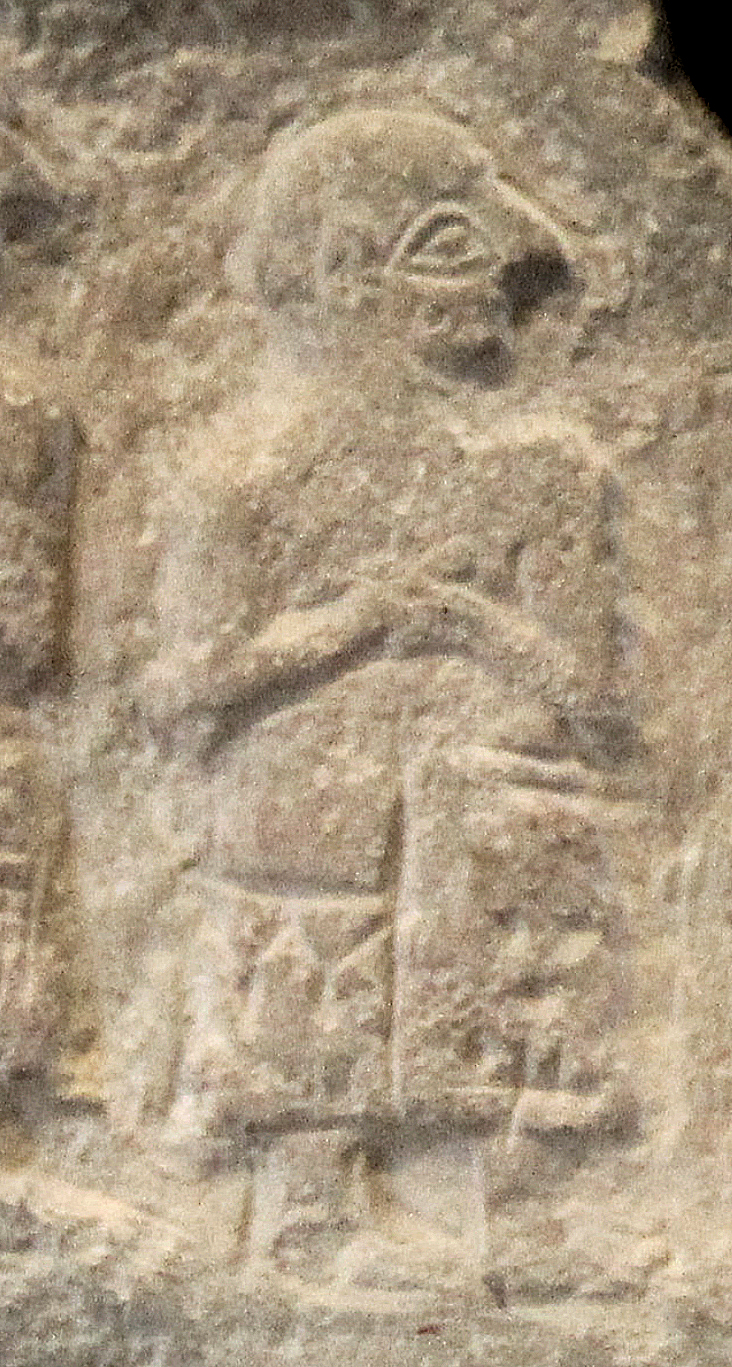
Akurgal as a child in the limestone votive relief of Ur-Nanshe

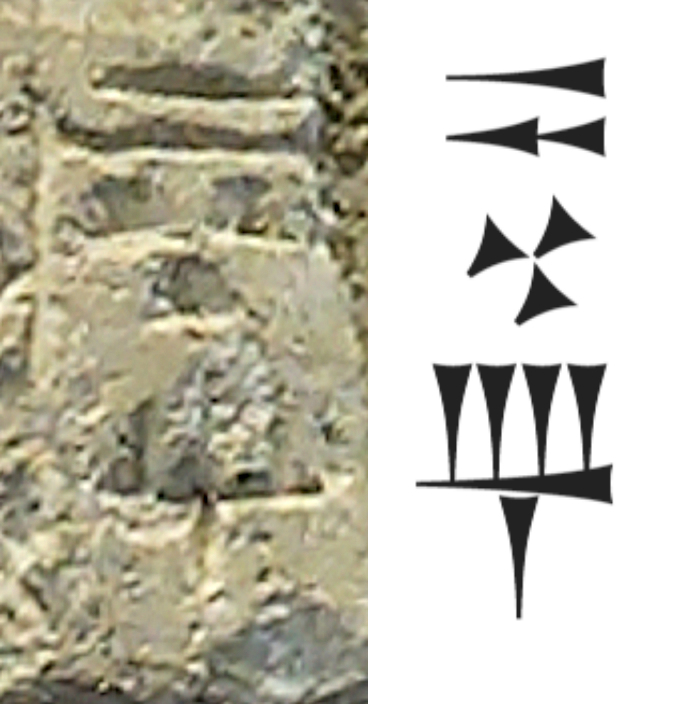
The name "Akurgal"

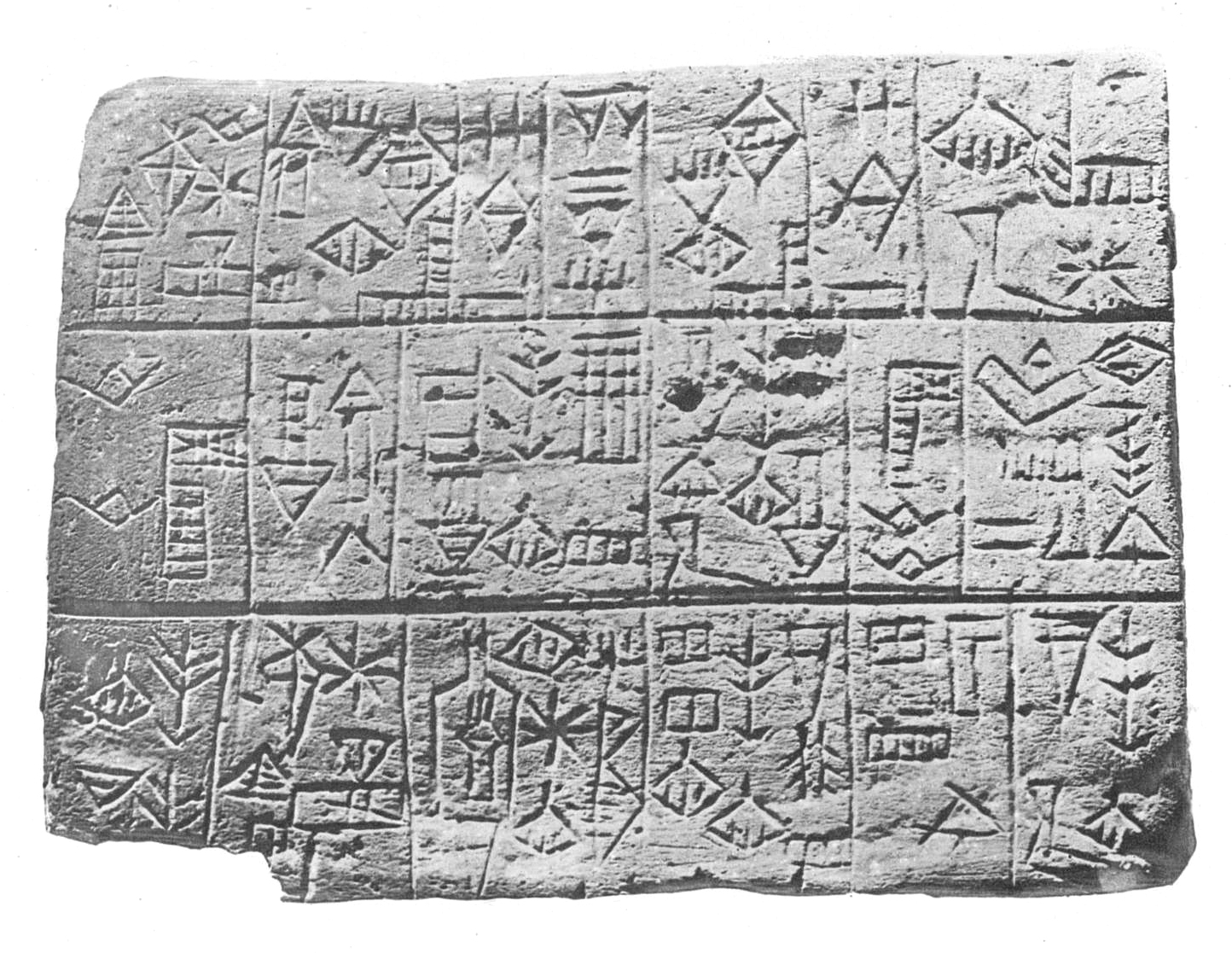
Tablet mentioning Akurgal, as father of Enannatum I: "Enannatum, ensi of Lagash, son of Akurgal, ensi of Lagash...."

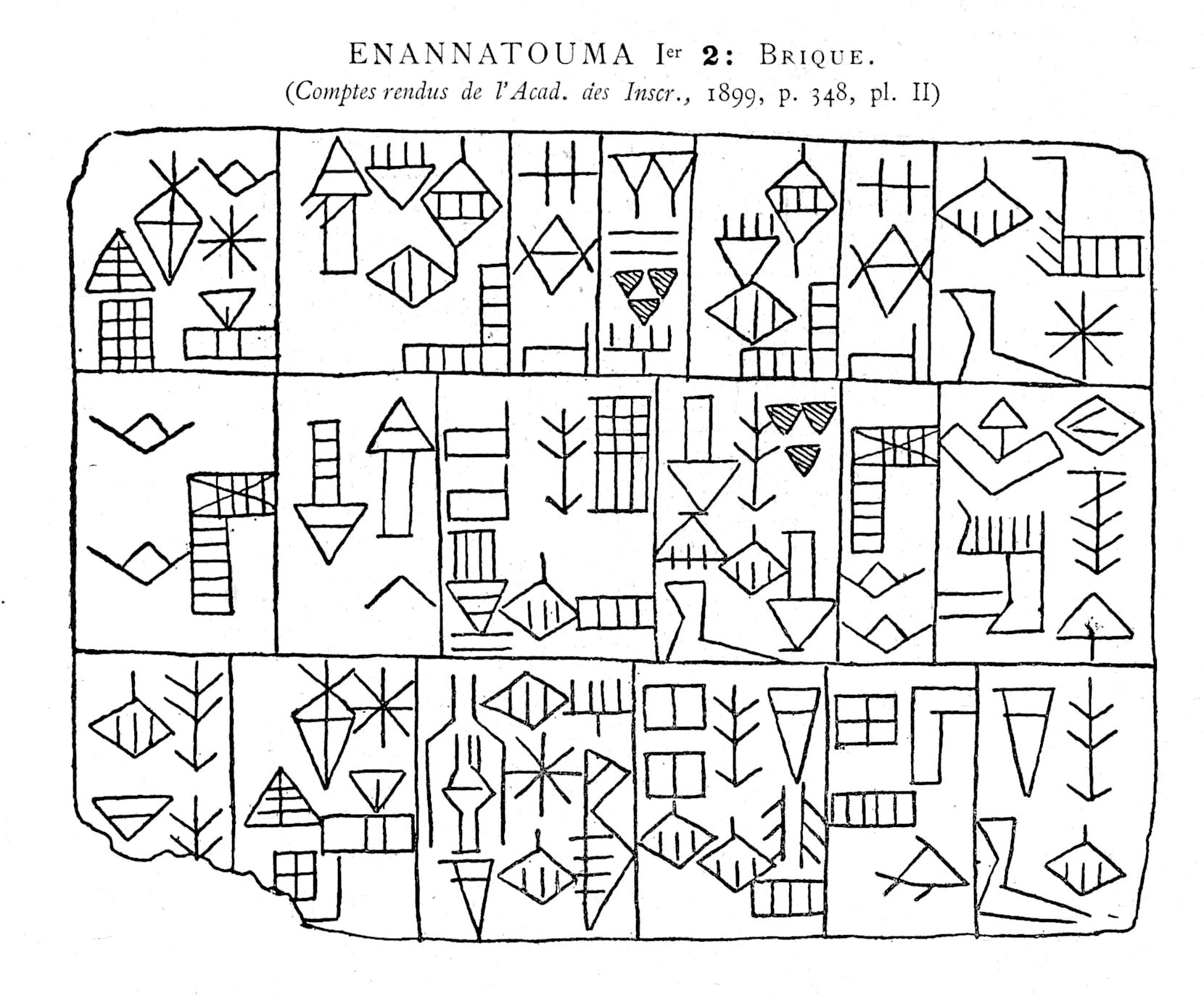
Tablet mentioning Akurgal, as father of Enannatum I: "Enannatum, ensi of Lagash, son of Akurgal, ensi of Lagash...."

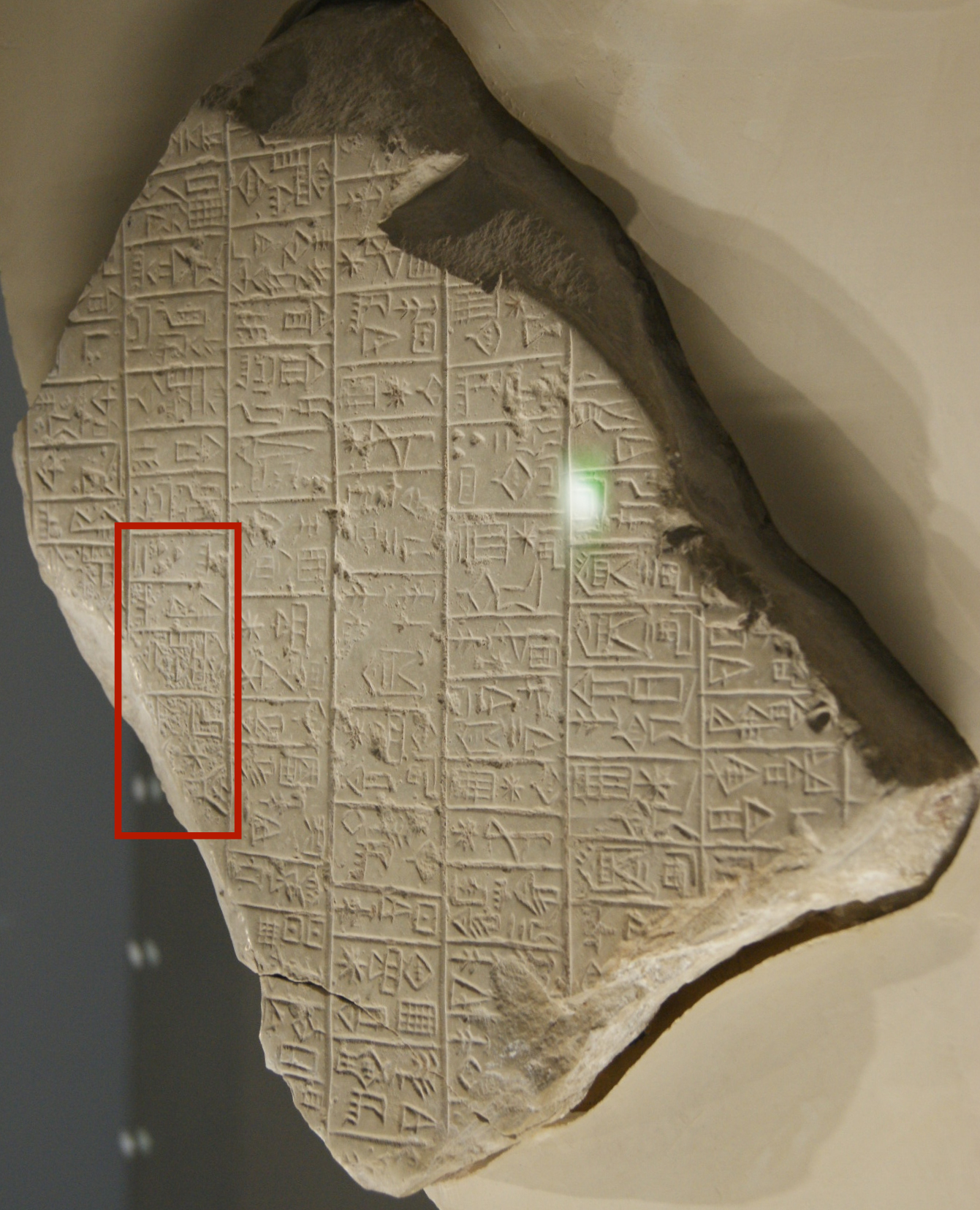
"Akurgal king of Lagash, son of Ur-Nanshe" (𒀀𒆳𒃲 𒈗 𒉢𒁓𒆷𒆠 𒌉 𒌨𒀭𒀏) on the Stele of the Vultures.

Regnal titles
Preceded by Possibly Ur-Nanshe	King of Lagash c. 2460 BC	Succeeded by Possibly Eannatum
