= 26th century BC =

One hundred years, from 2600 BC to 2501 BC

The 26th century BC was a century that lasted from the year 2600 BC to 2501 BC.

== Events ==
=== Crete ===
- c. 2600–2400 BC: Early Minoan I period in Crete.

=== Egypt ===
- c. 2551–2526 BC: Reign of Khufu, second pharaoh of the Fourth Dynasty. The height of the Old Kingdom under the reigns of Khufu, Khafre and Menkaure. Khufu leads an expedition in Sinai and has the Great Pyramid of Giza built. During his reign, the solar cult of Ra prevails, as evidenced by the Khufu ship. His successor, Djedefre, is the first pharaoh to refer to himself by the epithet "Son of Ra". The pharaoh's divine filiation asserts itself in the second part of the Fourth Dynasty: the royal title is definitively fixed with the appearance of a fifth royal name preceded by the title "Son of Ra".
- c. 2520–2493 BC: Reign of Khafre. the Pyramid of Khafre is built, along with the Great Sphinx of Giza, a monumental sculpture of a pharaoh (either Khafre or Khufu) with a lion's body.
- Reigns of Menkaure and Shepseskaf

=== Mesopotamia ===
- c. 2600–2334 BC: Early Dynastic period III. Dominion of the First Dynasty of Ur. The Royal Cemetery at Ur is constructed.
- c. 2600 BC: Reign of Akalamdug, king of Ur.
- c. 2600–2500 BC: The Instructions of Shuruppak, the earliest known literary texts, are created in Adab, Shuruppak and Abu Salabikh.
- 2570 BC: Reigns of Uhub, king of Kish, and of En-hegal, king of Lagash.
- 2560–2525 BC: Reign of Mesannepada, king of Ur. The city, which had only 4,000 citizens at the time, would become a large capital during the 40 years of Mesannepada's reign. Its opulence was brought about by its commercial activity: Ur's southern river port concentrated Mesopotamian trade with clients along the Persian Gulf shores.
- 2550 BC: Reign of Mesilim, king of Kish. He was an apparent suzerain over the Lagash king Luga-shag-engur and the Adab king Nin-kisalsi. A conflict between Lagash and the neighboring Umma begins over fields claimed by each of the parties. An initial crisis is settled by Mesilim in favor of Lagash.
- 2540 BC: Mesannepada, who has already dominated the city of Nippur, takes advantage of an eclipse of power in Kish (caused by an incursion by the Elamites of Awan) to seize the city. He becomes the ruler of all of Lower Mesopotamia as he becomes the king of Kish, and his name appears on a pearl in Mari.
- 2525–2485 BC: Reign of A'annepada, king of Ur.
