= Ush, king of Umma =

Ush 𒍑
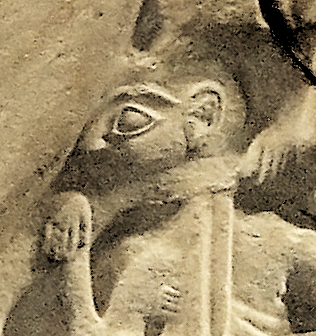
- Imprisoned man of Umma on the Stele of the Vultures

King of Umma
- Reign: c. 2450 BC
- Predecessor: Possibly Pabilgagaltuku
- Successor: Possibly Enakalle
- Dynasty: 1st Dynasty of Umma

Ush (𒍑 Uš, possibly read Ninta; fl. c. 2450 BC) was King or ensi of Umma, a city-state in Sumer.

Ush is mentioned in various inscriptions, such as the Cone of Entemana as having violated the frontier with Lagash, a frontier which had been solemnly established by king Mesilim.

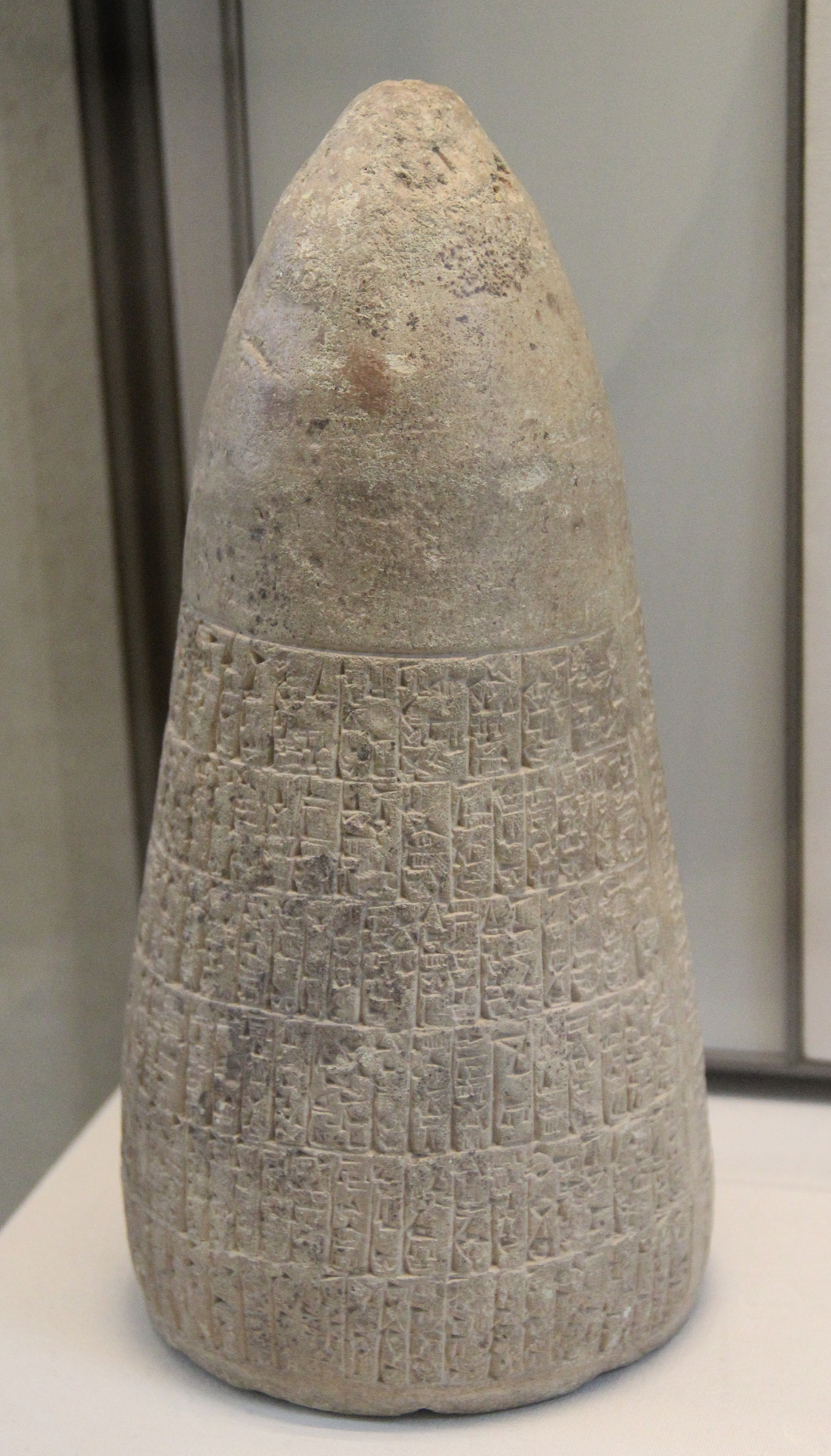

8–12

𒈨𒁲 𒈗𒆧𒆠𒆤 𒅗 𒀭𒅗𒁲𒈾𒋫 𒂠 𒃷 𒁉𒊏 𒆠𒁀 𒈾 𒉈𒆕
me-silim lugal kiš^{ki}-ke_{4} inim ^{d}ištaran-na-ta eš_{2} gana_{2} be_{2}-ra ki-ba na bi_{2}-ru_{2}
"Mesilim, king of Kiš, at the command of Ištaran, measured the field and set up a stele there."
13–17
𒍑 𒉺𒋼𒋛 𒄑𒆵𒆠𒆤 𒉆 𒅗𒈠 𒋛𒀀𒋛𒀀𒂠 𒂊𒀝
uš ensi_{2} umma^{ki}-ke_{4} nam inim-ma diri-diri-še_{3} e-ak
"Ush, ruler of Umma, acted unspeakably."
18–21
𒈾𒆕𒀀𒁉 𒉌𒉻 𒂔 𒉢𒁓𒆷𒆠𒂠 𒉌𒁺
na-ru_{2}-a-bi i_{3}-pad edin lagaš^{ki}-še_{3} i_{3}-g̃en
"He ripped out that stele and marched toward the plain of Lagaš."
Extract from the Cone of Enmetena, Room 236 Reference AO 3004, Louvre Museum.

Location of Umma

According to Enmetena's account, Ush is the one who invaded the territory of Lagash, and his invasion was then repelled, although the name of the ruler of Lagash who confronted him that time is not mentioned explicitly:

"Ninta (“Uš”), the governor of Umma, turned the matter into something that exceeds (any) word. He smashed that stela and marched on the plain of Lagash. Ningirsu, the warrior of Enlil, at his just command, did battle with Umma. At Enlil’s command, he spread the great throwing-net over it, and set up burial mounds for it on the plains.”

— Cone of Enmetena

It is thought that Ush was severely defeated by Eannatum, king of Lagash. The victory of Eannatum is mentioned in a fragmentary inscription on the stele, suggesting that after the loss of 3,600 soldiers on the field, Ush, king of Umma, was killed in a rebellion in his capital city of Umma:

"(Eanatum) defeated him. Its (Umma's) 3,600 corpses reached the base of heaven (...) raised (their) hands against him and killed him in Umma"

— Stele of the Vultures

Some historians assert that the Lagash king who defeated Ush was Lugalshaengur, and that Ush of Umma, Lugalshaengur of Lagash, Mesilim of Kish, and Nin-kisalsi of Adab were contemporary figures. Kim San-hae has argued that Ush was the first king of the 1st Dynasty of Umma, and that Pabilgagaltuku was his successor.

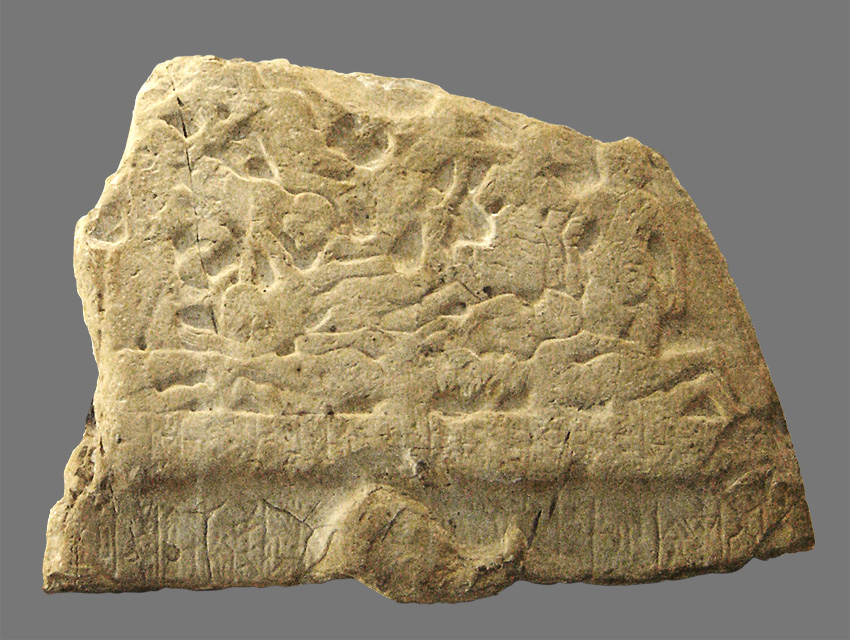
Slain soldiers of the army of Ush, on the battlefield. Stele of the Vultures.

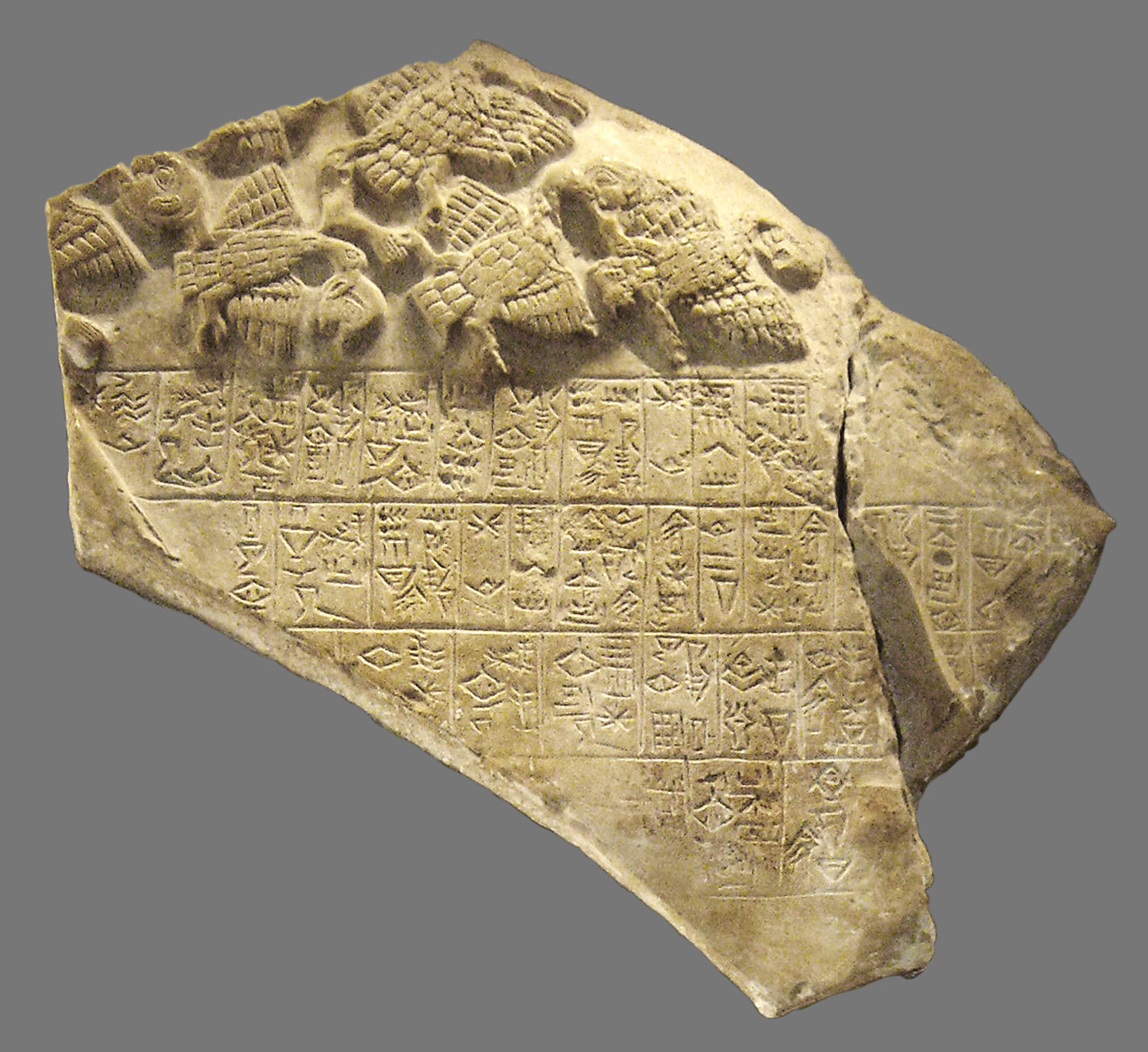
Soldiers of Enakalle being left to the vultures, after their defeat by Eannatum of Lagash. Stele of the Vultures.

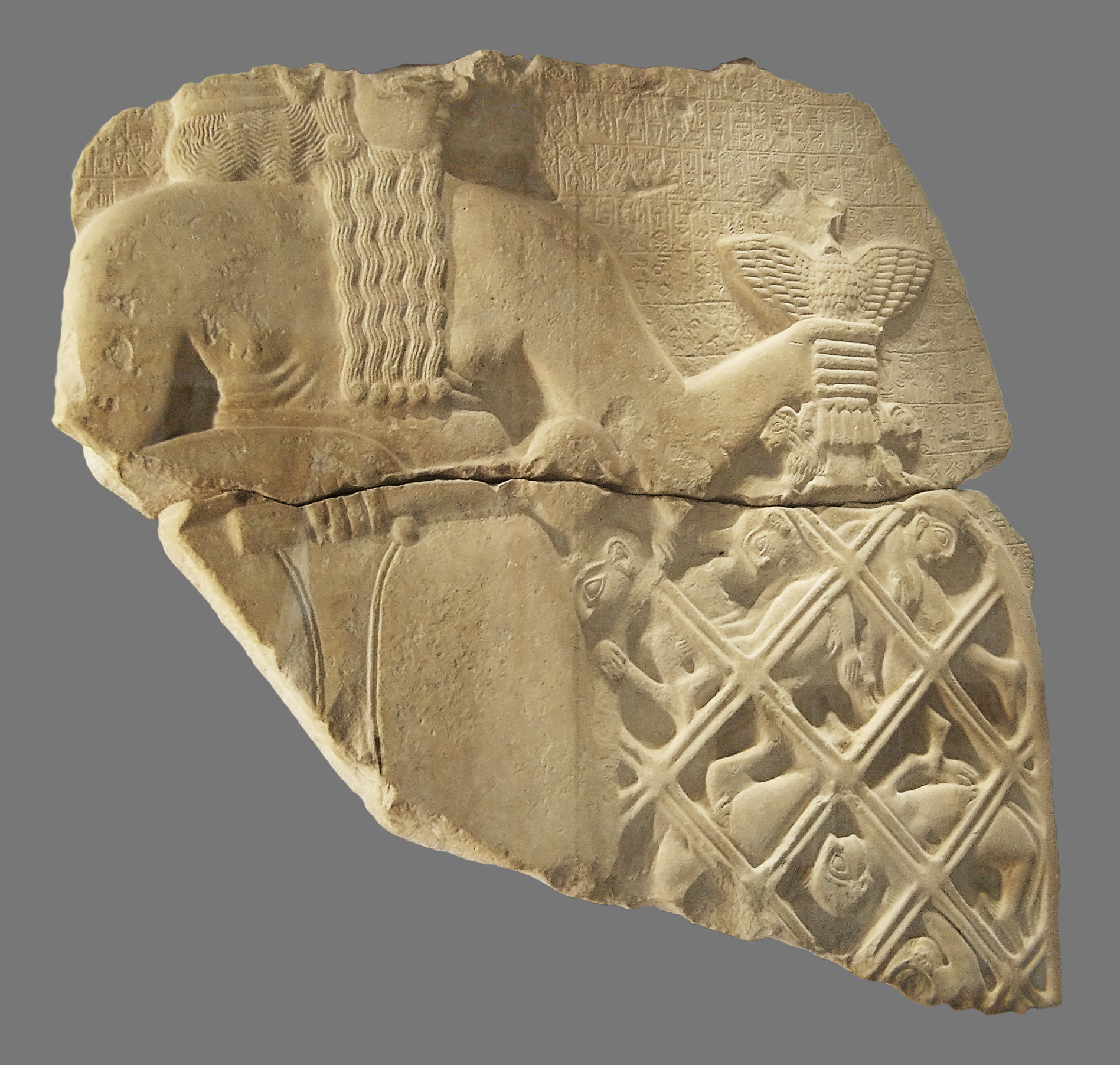
Prisoners captured in nets. Stele of the Vultures.

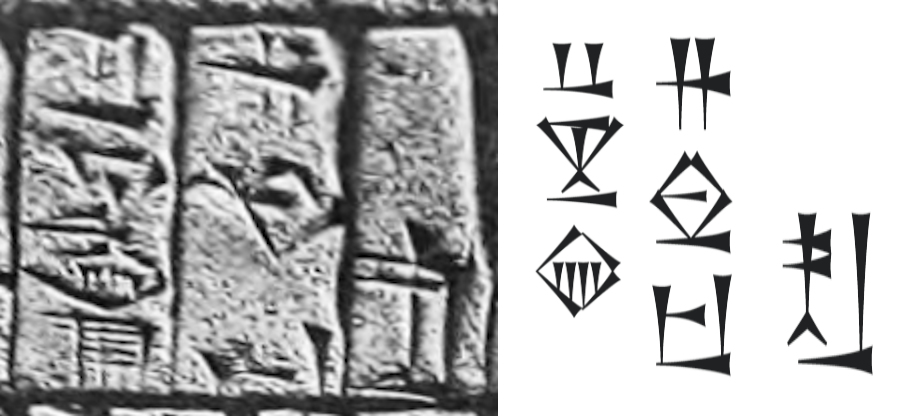
𒍑 𒑐𒋼𒋛 𒄑𒆵𒆠
Ush ensi Uma-ki
"Ush, Governor of Umma"
on the net cylinder of Entemena

Eannatum, king of Lagash, later made a boundary treaty with Enakalle, successor of Ush, settling the matter, as described in the Cone of Entemana.

== See also ==
- List of Mesopotamian dynasties
