= Pabilgagaltuku =

Pabilgagaltuku 𒉺𒉈𒅍𒃲𒌇

King of Umma
- Reign: c. 2450 BC
- Successor: Possibly Ush
- Dynasty: 1st Dynasty of Umma

Location of Umma

Pabilgagaltuku, also Pabilgeshgaltuku (𒉺𒉈𒅍𒃲𒌇, pa.bil2.ĝeš-gal-tuku; fl. c. 2450 BC) was Governor (ensi) of Umma, a city-state in Sumer. He was captured by Ur-Nanshe of Lagash. His successor may have been Ush.

Pabilgagaltuku is known from an inscription of Ur-Nanshe, in which Ur-Nanshe claims that he defeated Umma and captured Pabilgagaltuku:

pabilgax (pa.bil2.ĝeš)-gal-tuku ensi2 umma(geš.kušu2)ki mu-dab5
“He seized Pabilgagaltuku, the governor of Umma.”

— Inscription of Ur-Nanshe.

Pabilgagaltuku may also be mentioned in the Stele of the Vultures, as having been vanquished in the past by Ur-Nanshe.

== See also ==
- List of Mesopotamian dynasties
