= En-hegal =

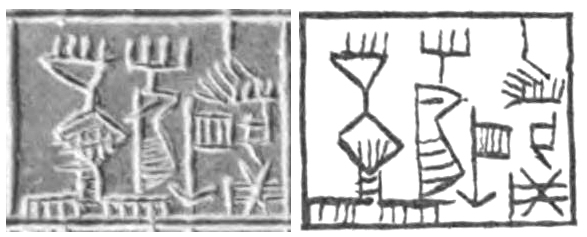
- Inscription For En-hegal, King of Lagash (𒂗𒃶𒅅 𒈗𒂠 𒉢𒁓𒆷), in the Tablet of En-hegal

King of Lagash
- Reign: c. 2570 BC
- Successor: Possibly Lugalshaengur
- Dynasty: 1st dynasty of Lagash

Location of Lagash

En-hegal, also Enhengal (Sumerian: 𒂗𒃶𒅅, en-ḫe₂-ŋal₂; fl. c. 2570 BC), was possibly an ancient ruler of the Sumerian city-state of Lagash. Only one inscription mentioning him is known, the "Tablet of En-hegal", describing a business transaction. If indeed a king of Lagash, it is estimated he would have ruled around 2570 BC.

The tablet with his name describes a business transaction, in which a possible King En-hegal buys land. He seems to have purchased about 1,000 hectares of land. A tentative translation of the tablet was published by George Barton.

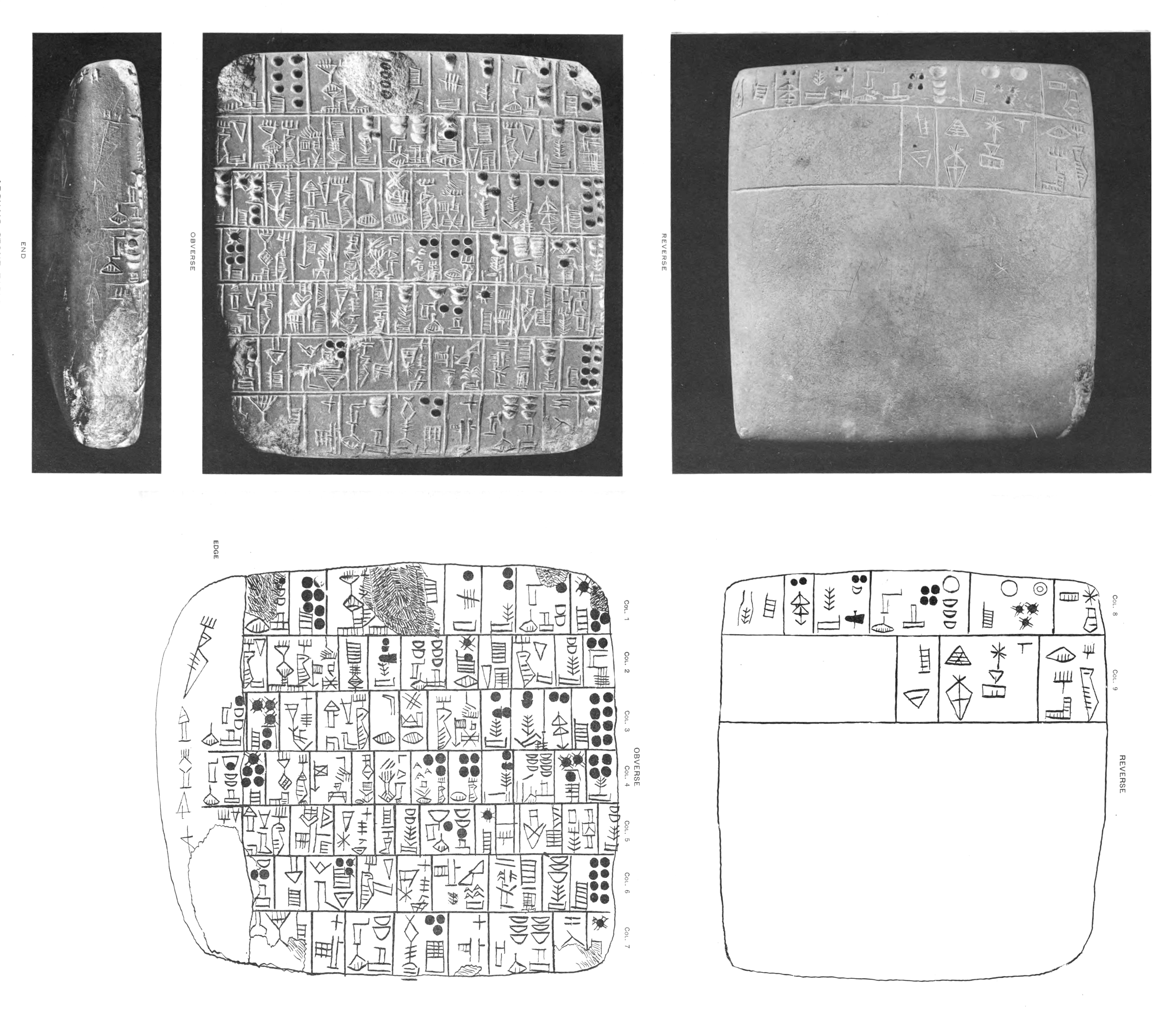
The Tablet of En-hegal records major land transactions by King En-hegal.

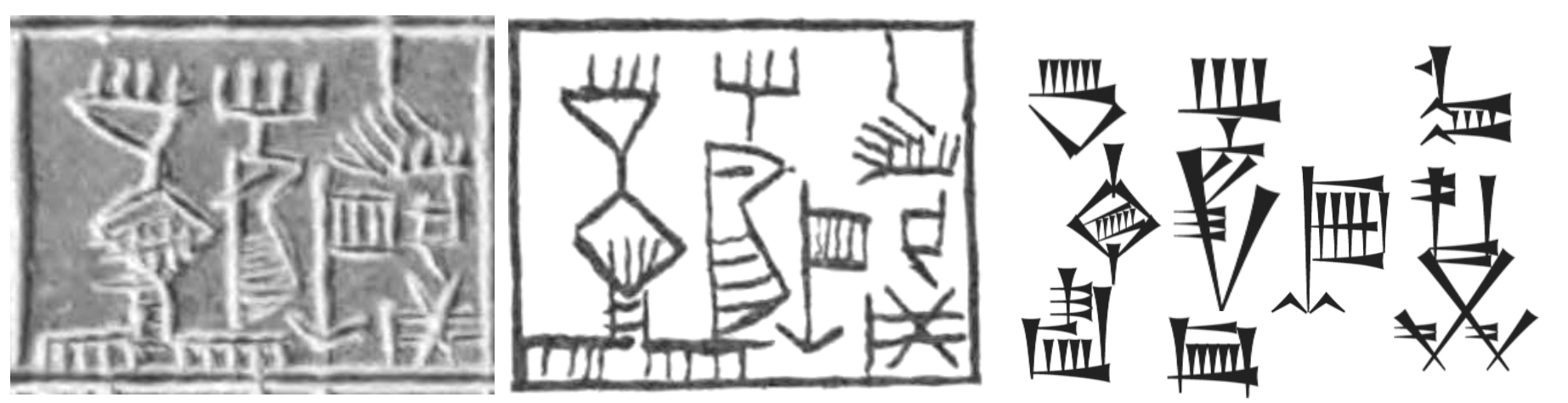
Inscription "For Enhegal King of Lagash", with transcription in standard Sumero-Akkadian cuneiform (𒂗𒃶𒅅 𒈗𒂠 𒉢𒁓𒆷, En-hegal Lugal še Lagash).

== See also ==
- History of Sumer

== Bibliography ==
- Vojtech Zamarovský, Na počiatku bol Sumer, Mladé letá, 1968 Bratislava
- Plamen Rusev, Mesalim, Lugal Na Kish: Politicheska Istoriia Na Ranen Shumer (XXVIII-XXVI V. Pr. N. E.), Faber, 2001 (LanguageBulgarian) [(Mesalim, Lugal of Kish. Political History of Early Sumer (XXVIII–XXVI century BC.)]

Regnal titles
Preceded by	King of Lagash c. 2570 BC	Succeeded by Possibly Lugalshaengur
