= Mesilim =

Mesilim 𒈨𒁲
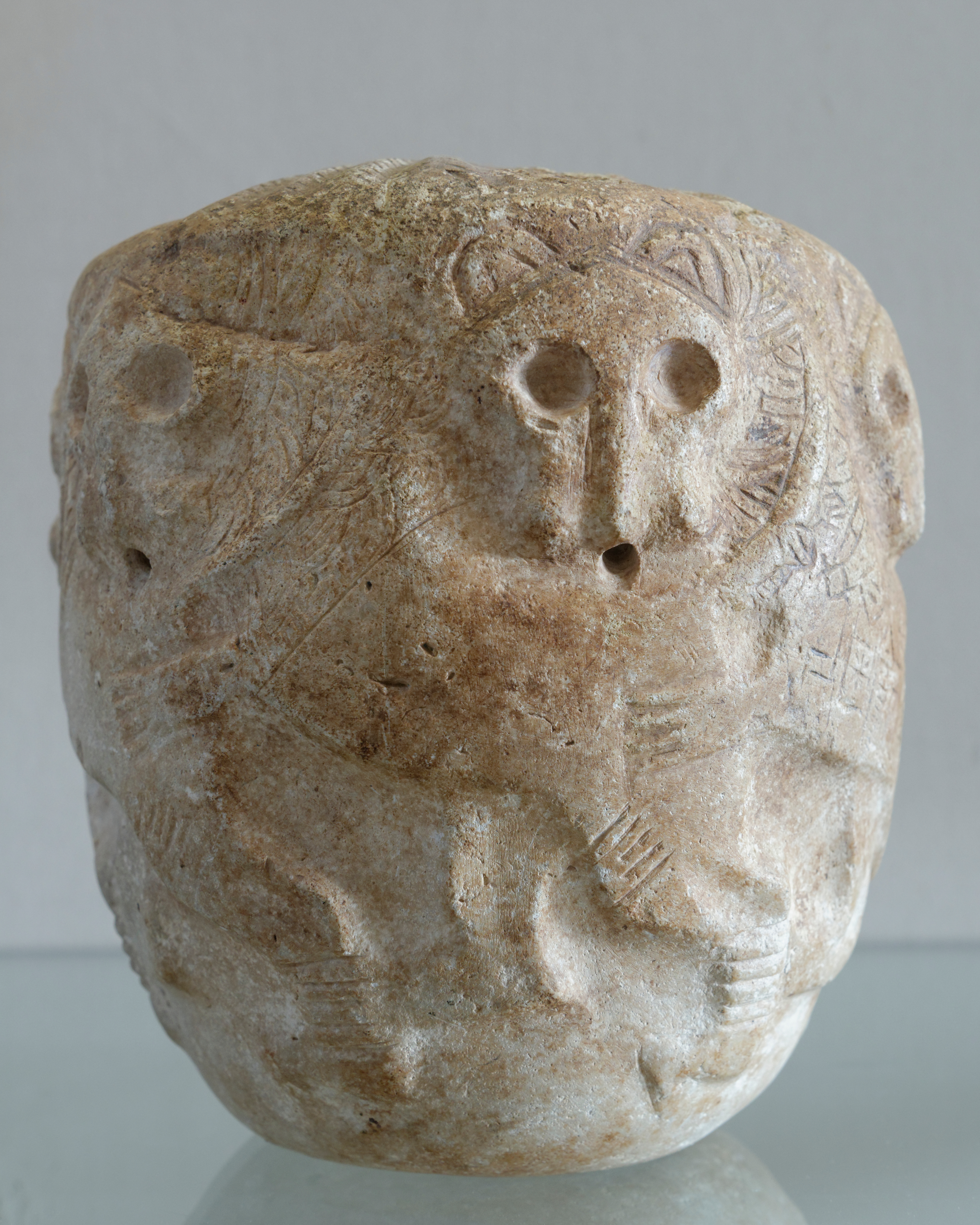
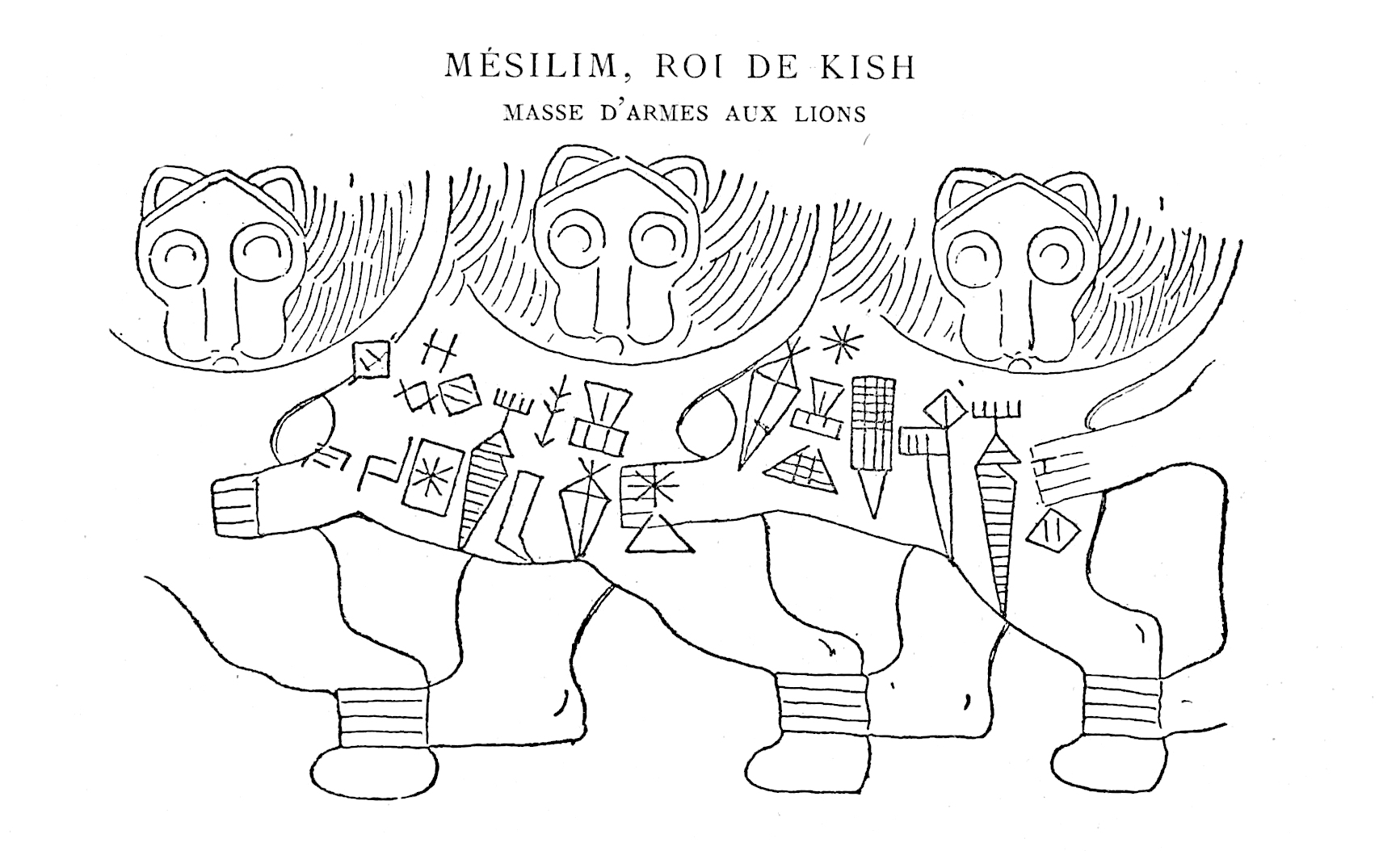
- Head of a votive mace with a lion-headed eagle (emblem of god Ningirsu) and six lions, dedicated at a shrine in Girsu by King Mesilim of Kish. Inscription in archaic script: “Mesilim, king of Kish, builder of the temple of Ningirsu, brought [this mace head] for Ningirsu, Lugalshaengur [being] prince of Lagash”. Louvre Museum.

King of Kish
- Reign: c. 2550 BC
- Predecessor: Possibly Uhub

Mesilim (Sumerian: 𒈨𒁲), also spelled Mesalim (fl. c. 2550 BC), was lugal (king) of the Sumerian city-state of Kish.

Though his name is missing from the Sumerian king list, Mesilim is among the earliest historical figures recorded in archaeological documents. He reigned some time in the "Early Dynastic III" period (c. 2600–2350 BC). Inscriptions from his reign state that he sponsored temple constructions in both Adab and Lagash, where he apparently enjoyed some suzerainty. He is also known from a number of fragments.

== Frontier mediator ==
Mesilim is best known for having acted as mediator in a conflict between Lugal-sha-engur, his ensi in Lagash, and the neighboring rival city state of Umma, regarding the rights to use an irrigation canal through the plain of Gu-Edin on the border between the two. After asking the opinion of the god Ištaran, Mesilim established a new border between Lagash and Umma, and erected a pillar to mark it, on which he wrote his final decision. This solution was not to be permanent; a later king of Umma, Ush, destroyed the pillar in an act of defiance. These events are mentioned in one of the inscriptions of the ruler of Lagash Entemena, as an ancient foundational event which settled the frontier between the two Sumerian cities.

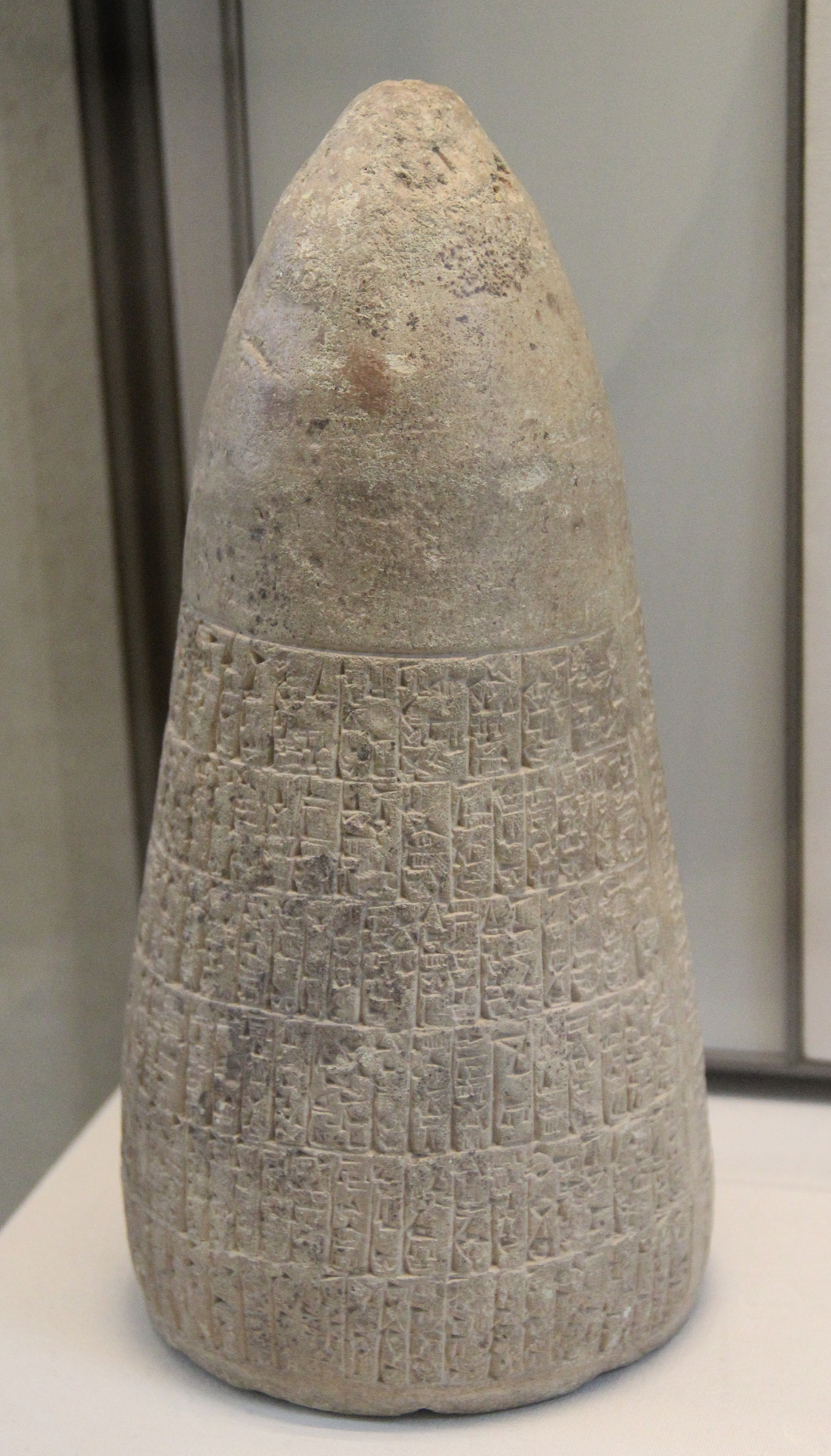

8–12

𒈨𒁲 𒈗𒆧𒆠𒆤 𒅗 𒀭𒅗𒁲𒈾𒋫 𒂠 𒃷 𒁉𒊏 𒆠𒁀 𒈾 𒉈𒆕
me-silim lugal kiš^{ki}-ke_{4} inim ^{d}ištaran-na-ta eš_{2} gana_{2} be_{2}-ra ki-ba na bi_{2}-ru_{2}

"Mesilim, king of Kiš, at the command of Ištaran, measured the field and set up a stele there."

Extract from the Cone of Enmetena, Room 236 Reference AO 3004, Louvre Museum.

== Identification ==
Location of Kish

In the 1950s, Sumerologist Edmund Gordon reviewed the literary evidence and suggested a tentative theory that Mesilim and King Mesannepada of Ur, who later in his reign also assumed the title "King of Kish", were in fact one and the same. Both names are known elsewhere from a unique Mesopotamian proverb about the king whose temple was torn down. In Sumerian version, the proverb reads "The E-babbar which Mesilim had built, Annane, the man whose seed was cut off, tore down." E-babbar was the temple in Lagash, and Gordon took Annane to be a corruption of the name A-anne-pada, i.e. Mes-anne-pada's own son. The much later Akkadian proverb reads "The temple which Mesannepadda had built, Nanna, whose seed was picked off, tore down". However, Thorkild Jacobsen disputed this theory and reached the opposite conclusion, that Mesilim and Mesannepada were probably distinct, arguing that the Akkadian scribe did not recognise the name of Mesilim that was not on the kinglist, and simply substituted that of a name he knew from the list.

Per his own inscription on the head of a mace, Mesilin was contemporary with an otherwise unknown king of Lagash named Lugalshaengur. This suggests that Mesilin ruled before the Lagash dynasty of Ur-Nanshe.

Mesilim is also known from other fragmentary inscriptions. In particular, there are two dynastic administrative tablets in which he is named as contemporary (and probably suzerain) of Lugalshaengur, Governor of Lagash, and Nin-Kisalsi, Governor of Adab. One inscription on a bowl reads:

𒈨𒁲 𒈗𒆧𒆠/ 𒂍𒊬 𒁓 𒈬𒄄 / 𒎏𒆦𒋛 𒑐𒋼𒋛 𒌓𒉣

me-silim lugal kisz e2-sar bur mu-gi4 nin-KISAL-si ensix(GAR.PA.TE.SI) adab
"Me-silim, king of Kish, to the Esar temple sent over (this) bowl (for the burgi ritual). Nin-KISALsi, (was) the governor of Adab."

— Inscription of Mesilim mentioning Nin-Kisalsi

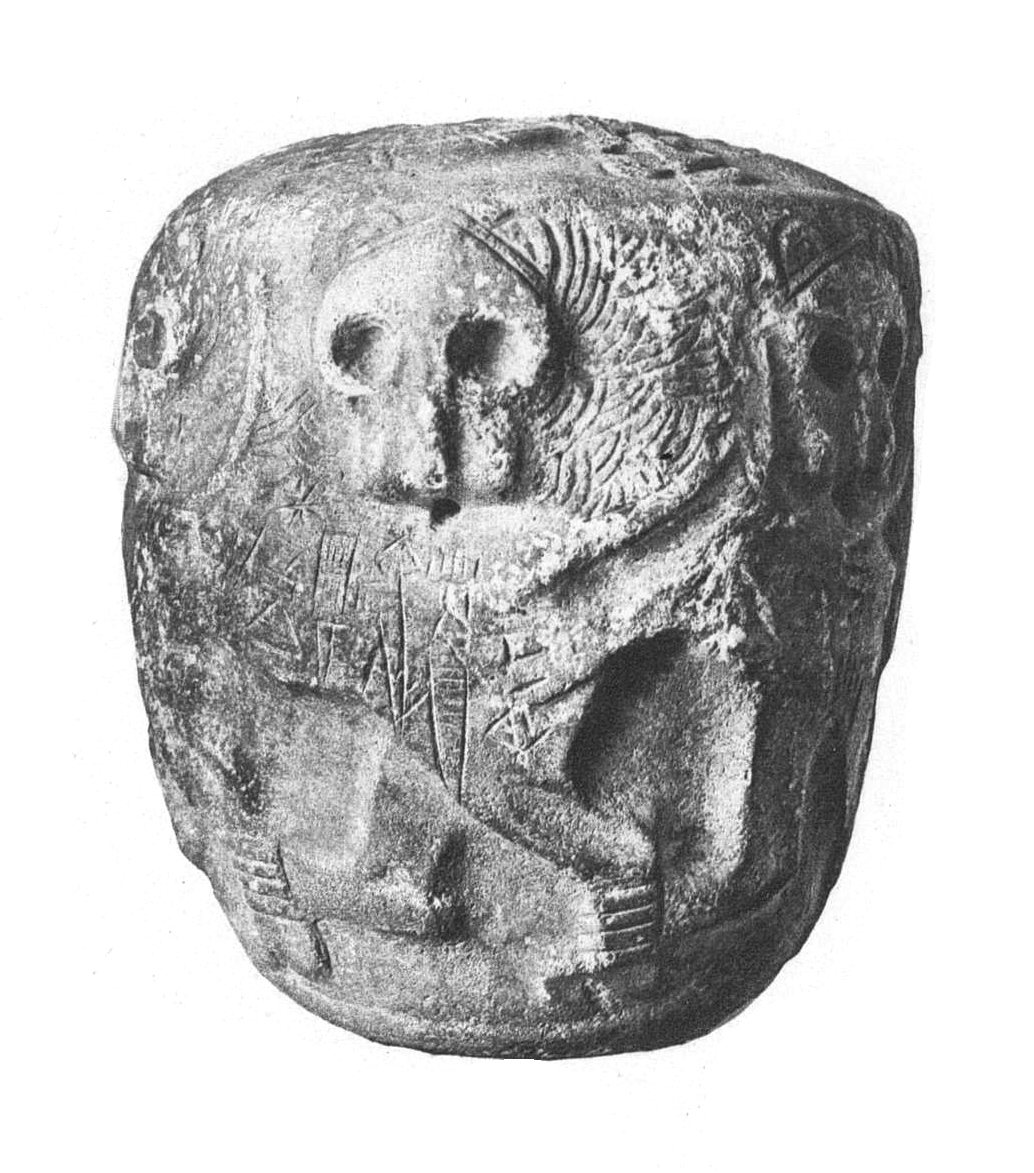
Mesilim macehead at time of discovery

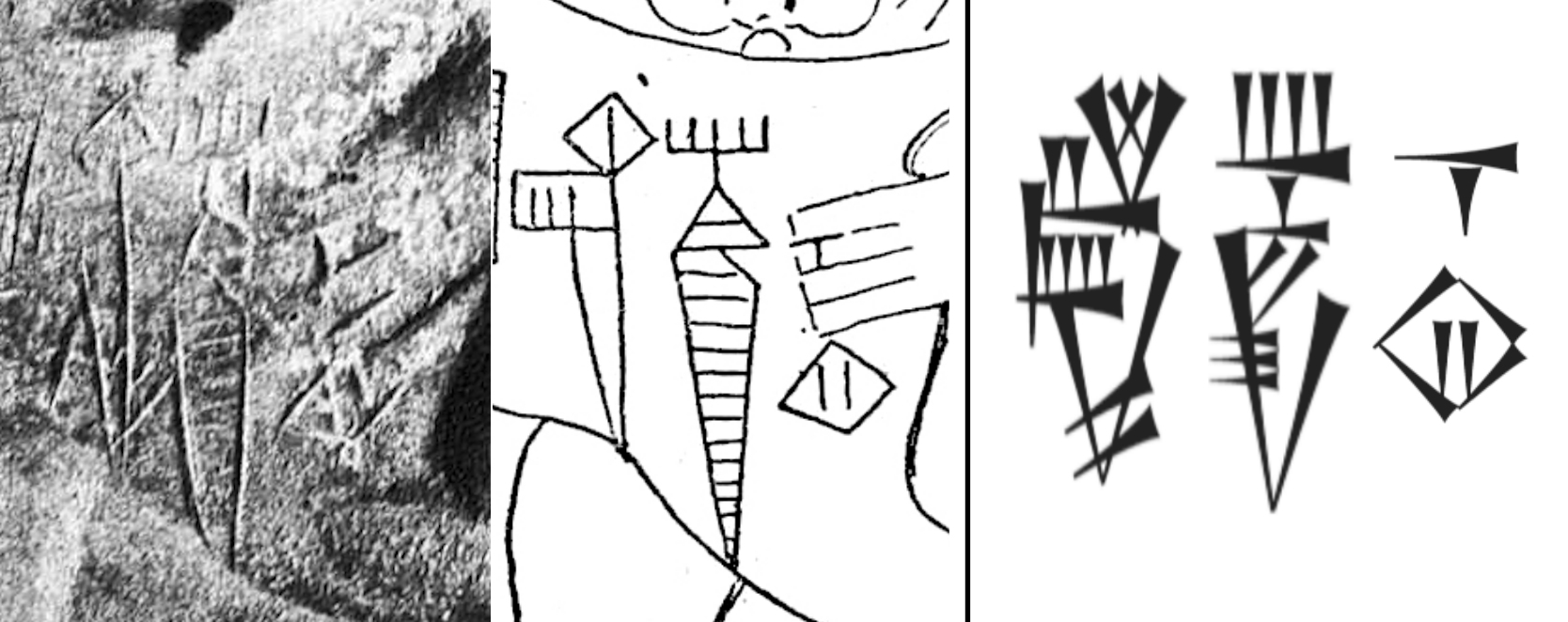
Mesilim macehead with inscription Mesilim Lugal Kish (𒈨𒁲 𒈗 𒆧), "Mesilim, King of Kish".

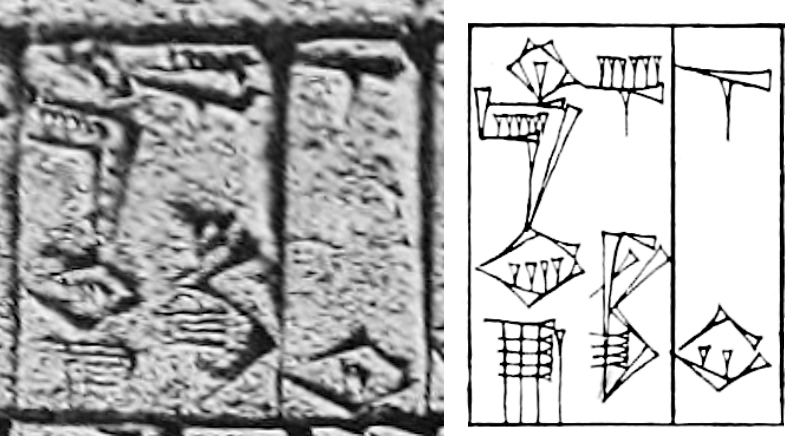
Mesilim Lugal Kish-ki (𒈨𒁲 𒈗 𒆧𒆠), "Mesilim, King of Kish", on the "Net Cylinder" of Entemena

== See also ==
- History of Sumer

== Bibliography ==
- Vojtech Zamarovský, Na počiatku bol Sumer, Mladé letá, 1968 Bratislava
- Plamen Rusev, Mesalim, Lugal Na Kish: Politicheska Istoriia Na Ranen Shumer (XXVIII-XXVI V. Pr. N. E.), Faber, 2001 (LanguageBulgarian) [(Mesalim, Lugal of Kish. Political History of Early Sumer (XXVIII–XXVI century BC.)]
