= Stele of the Vultures =

Historical and mythical limestone account / depiction

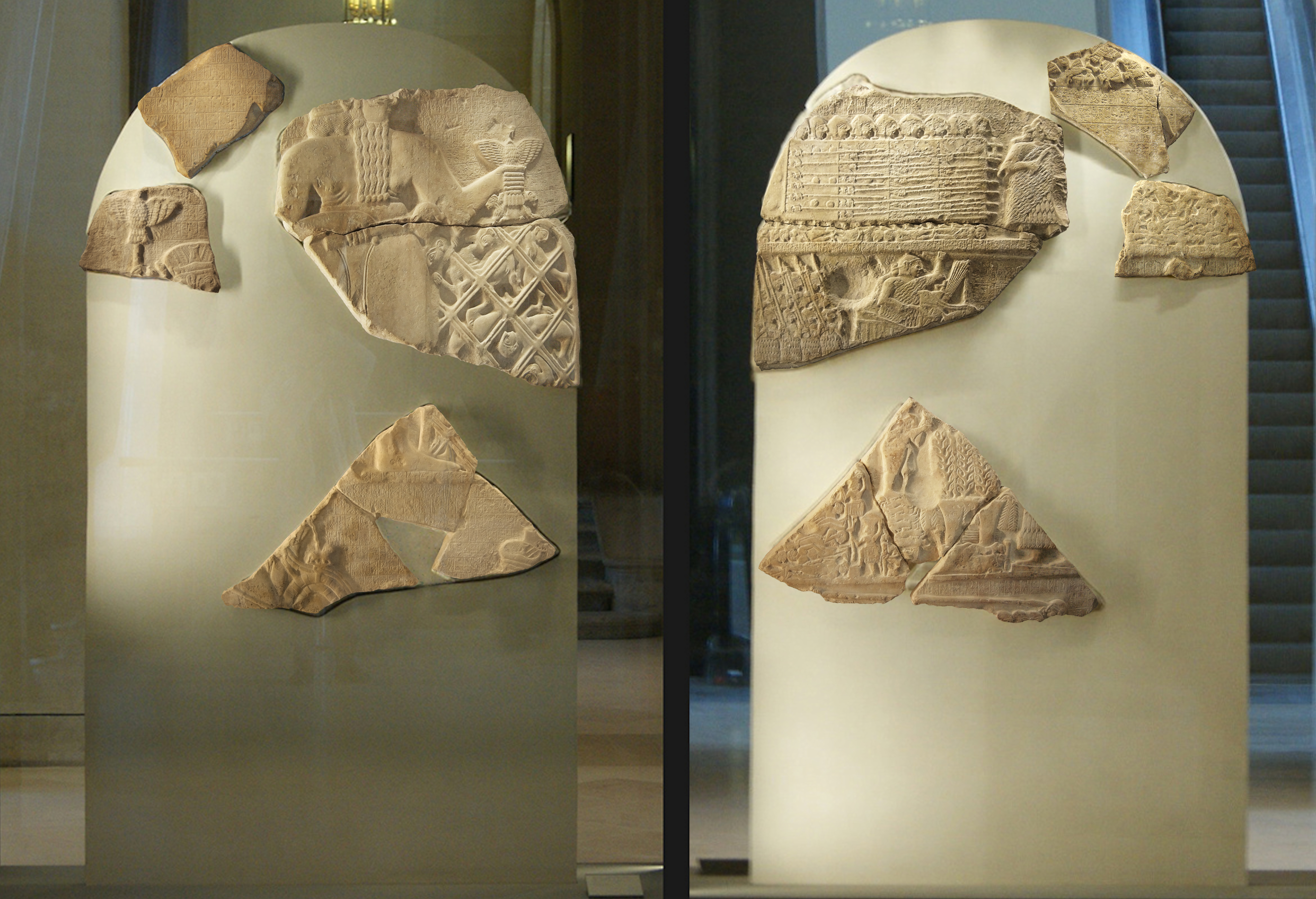
- The stele in the Louvre Museum (front and back)
- Material: Limestone
- Size: Height: 1.8 metres (5 ft 11 in); Width: 1.3 metres (4 ft 3 in); Thickness: 11 centimetres (4.3 in)
- Writing: Sumerian cuneiform
- Created: c. 2475 BC
- Discovered: c. 1883; Tello, Dhi Qar, Iraq
- Discovered by: Ernest Sarzec
- Present location: Musée du Louvre, Paris
- Identification: AO 16 IO9, AO 50, AO 2246, AO 2348
- Registration: CDLI P222399

The Stele of the Vultures is a monument from the Early Dynastic IIIb period (2600–2350 BC) in Mesopotamia celebrating a victory of the city-state of Lagash over its neighbour Umma in the Umma–Lagash war. It shows various battle and religious scenes and is named after the vultures that can be seen in one of these scenes. The stele was originally carved out of a single slab of limestone, but only seven fragments are known to have survived up to the present day. The fragments were found at Tello (ancient Girsu) in southern Iraq in the 1880s and are now on display in the Louvre. The stele was erected as a monument to the victory of king Eannatum of Lagash over Ush, king of Umma. It is the earliest known war monument.

== Discovery ==
The stele is not complete; only seven fragments are known today. The first three fragments were found during excavations in the early 1880s by the French archaeologist Ernest de Sarzec at the archaeological site of Tello, ancient Girsu, in what is today southern Iraq. Another three fragments came to light during the excavations of 1888–1889. A seventh fragment, which was later determined to be part of the Stele of the Vultures and thought to have come from Tello, was acquired on the antiquities market by the British Museum in 1898. While two initial requests to hand this fragment over to the Louvre were denied by the British Museum, it was eventually given to them in 1932 so that it could be incorporated in the reconstructed stele together with the other fragments. It was first translated by F. Thureau-Dangin in 1907.

== Description ==
The complete monument, as reconstructed and now in display in the Louvre, would have been 1.80 metres (5 ft 11 in) high, 1.30 metres (4 ft 3 in) wide and 11 centimetres (4.3 in) thick and had a rounded top. It was made out of a single slab of limestone with carved reliefs on both sides. The stele can be placed in a tradition of mid- to late-third millennium BC southern Mesopotamia in which military victories are celebrated on stone monuments. A similar monument is the Victory Stele of Naram-Sin, created during the Akkadian period that followed on the Early Dynastic III period.

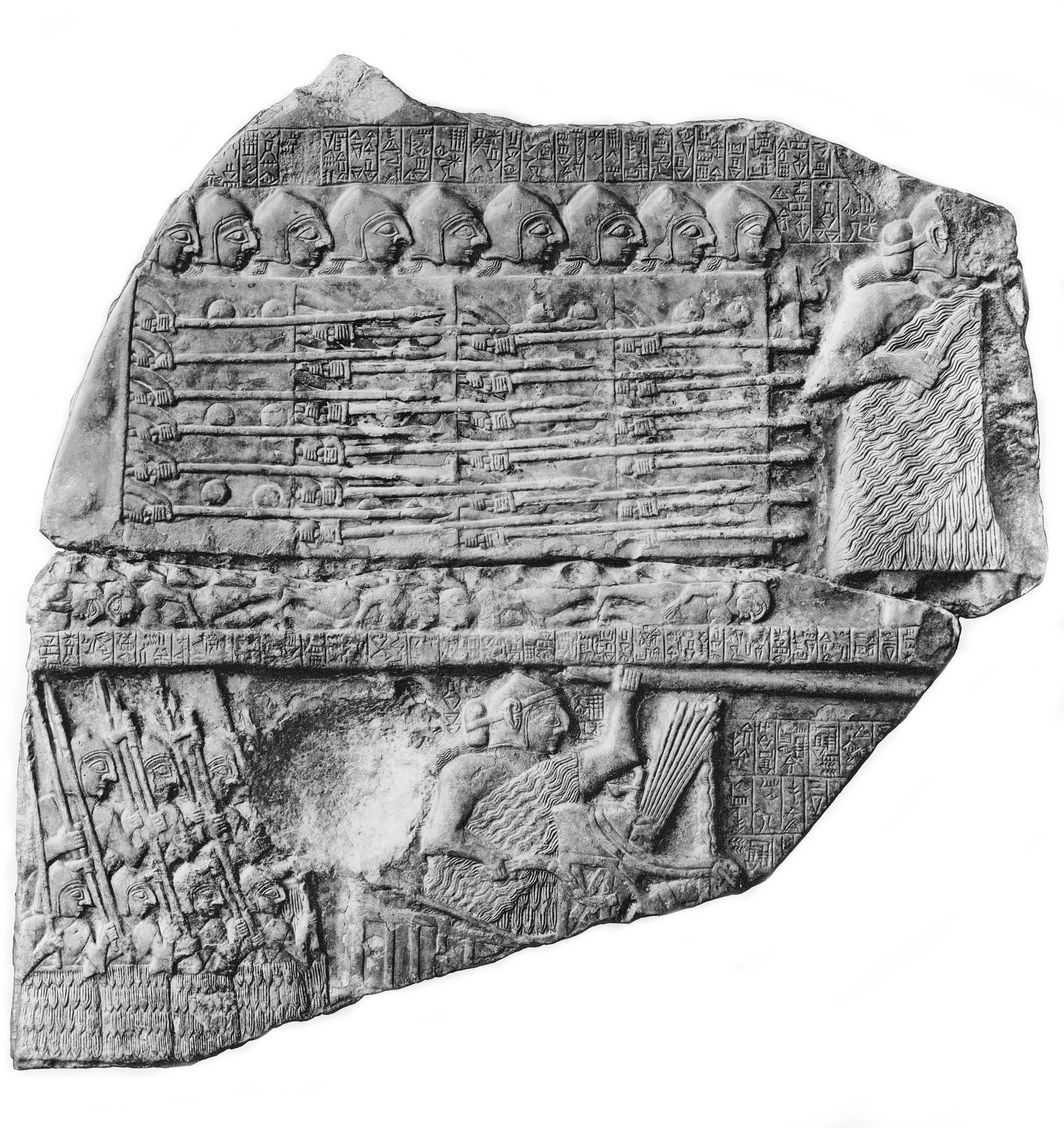
Fragment of the Stele of the Vultures.

The two sides of the stele show distinctly different scenes and have therefore been interpreted as a mythological side and a historical side. The mythological side is divided into two registers. The upper, larger register shows a large male figure holding a mace in his right hand and an anzu or lion-headed eagle in his left hand. The anzu identifies the figure as the god Ningirsu. Below the anzu is a large net filled with the bodies of naked men. Behind Ningirsu stands a smaller female figure wearing a horned headband and with maces protruding from her shoulders. These characteristics allow the figure to be identified as the goddess Ninhursag. The lower, smaller register is very badly preserved but, based on comparisons with contemporary depictions, it has been suggested that it depicted the god Ningirsu standing on a chariot drawn by mythological animals. A more recent analysis suggests that the chariot is approaching Ninhursag standing outside a sacred building.

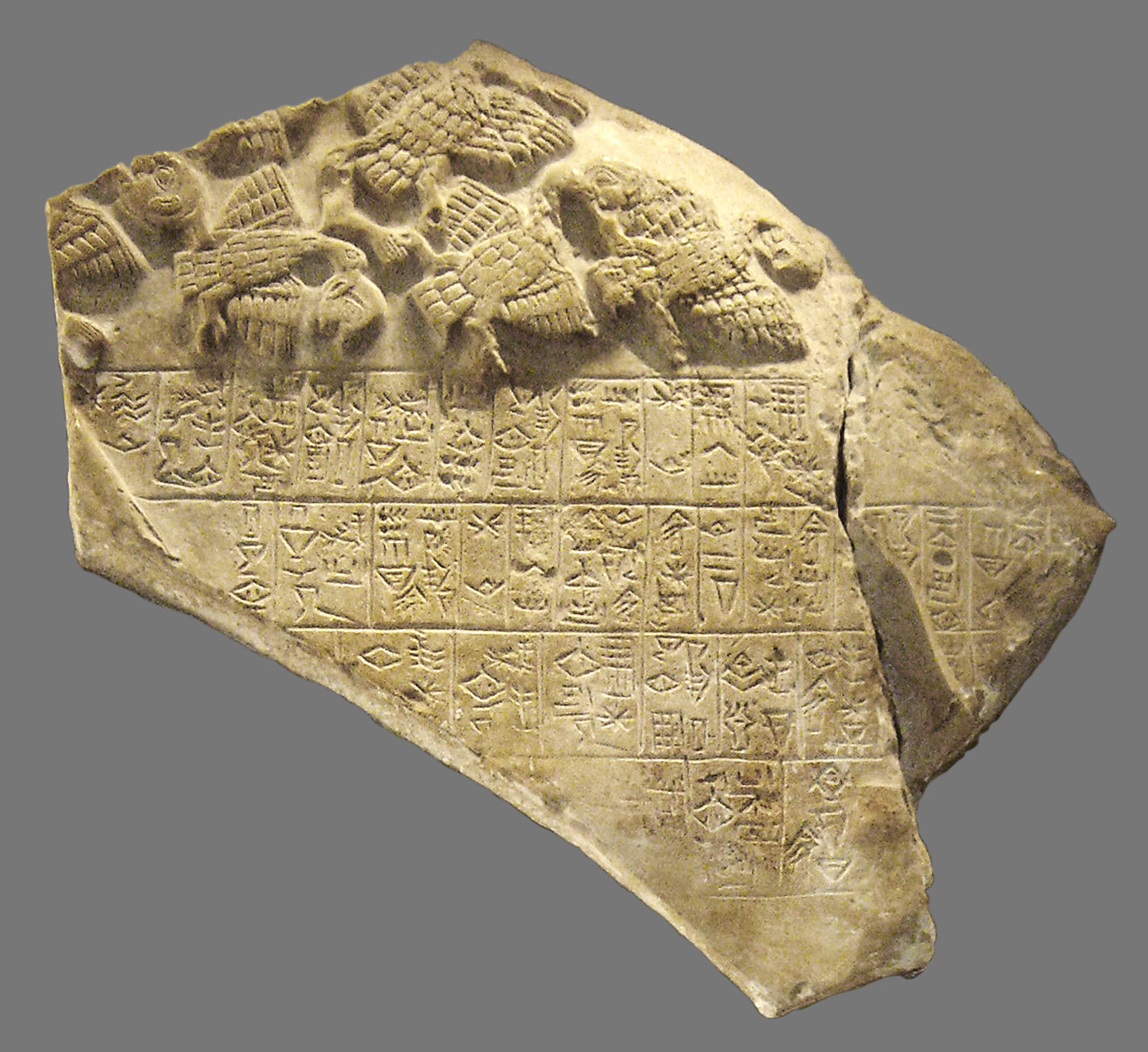
A fragment of the Stele of the Vultures showing vultures with severed human heads in their beaks and a fragment of cuneiform script

The historical side is divided into four horizontal registers. The upper register shows Eannatum, the ensi or ruler of Lagash (his name appears inscribed around his head), leading a phalanx of soldiers into battle, with their defeated enemies trampled below their feet. Flying above them are the vultures after which the stele is named, with the severed heads of the enemies of Lagash in their beaks. The second register shows soldiers marching with shouldered spears behind the king, who is riding a chariot and holding a spear. In the third register, a small part of a possibly seated figure can be seen. In front of him, a cow is tethered to a pole while a naked priest standing on a pile of dead animal bodies performs a libation ritual on two plants spouting from vases. Left of these scenes is a pile of naked bodies surrounded by skirted workers with baskets on their head. Only a small part of the fourth register has been preserved, showing a hand holding a spear that touches the head of an enemy. Some Sumerologists have proposed reconstructing a caption near the enemy as "Kalbum, King of Kish".

The inscriptions on the stele are badly preserved. They fill the negative spaces in the scenes and run continuously from one side to the other. Of the original roughly 840 lines 350 are complete and 130 are partially preserved. The text is written in Sumerian cuneiform script. From these inscriptions, it is known that the stele was commissioned by Eannatum, an ensi or ruler of Lagash around 2460 BC. On it, he describes a conflict with Umma over Gu-Edin, a tract of agricultural land located between the two city-states. The conflict ends in a battle in which Eannatum, described as the beloved of the god Ningirsu, triumphs over Umma. After the battle, the leader of Umma swears that he will not transgress into the territory of Lagash again upon penalty of divine punishment. Barton argues that the Garden of Eden story may be based on the Stele of the Vultures.

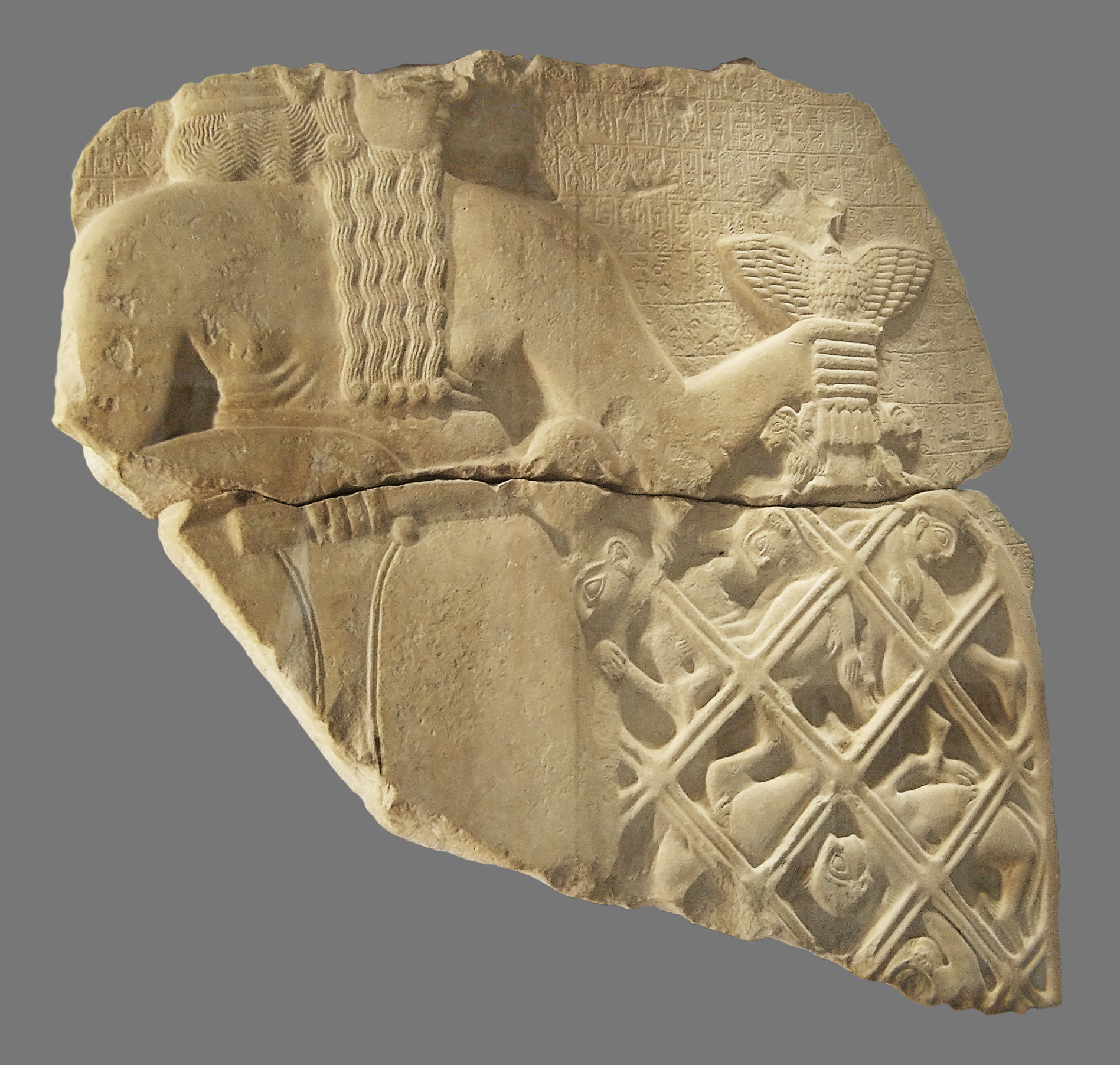
Upper register of the "mythological" side

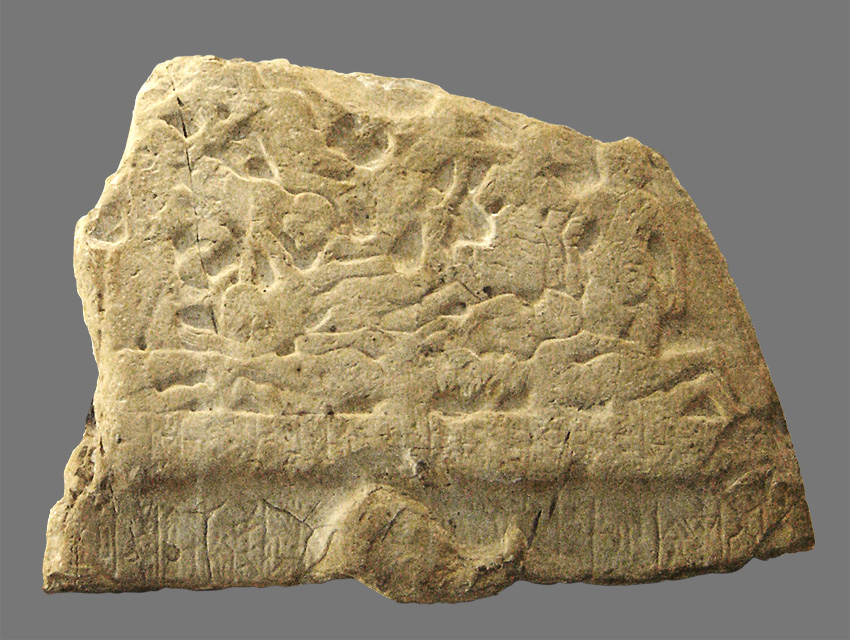
Another fragment

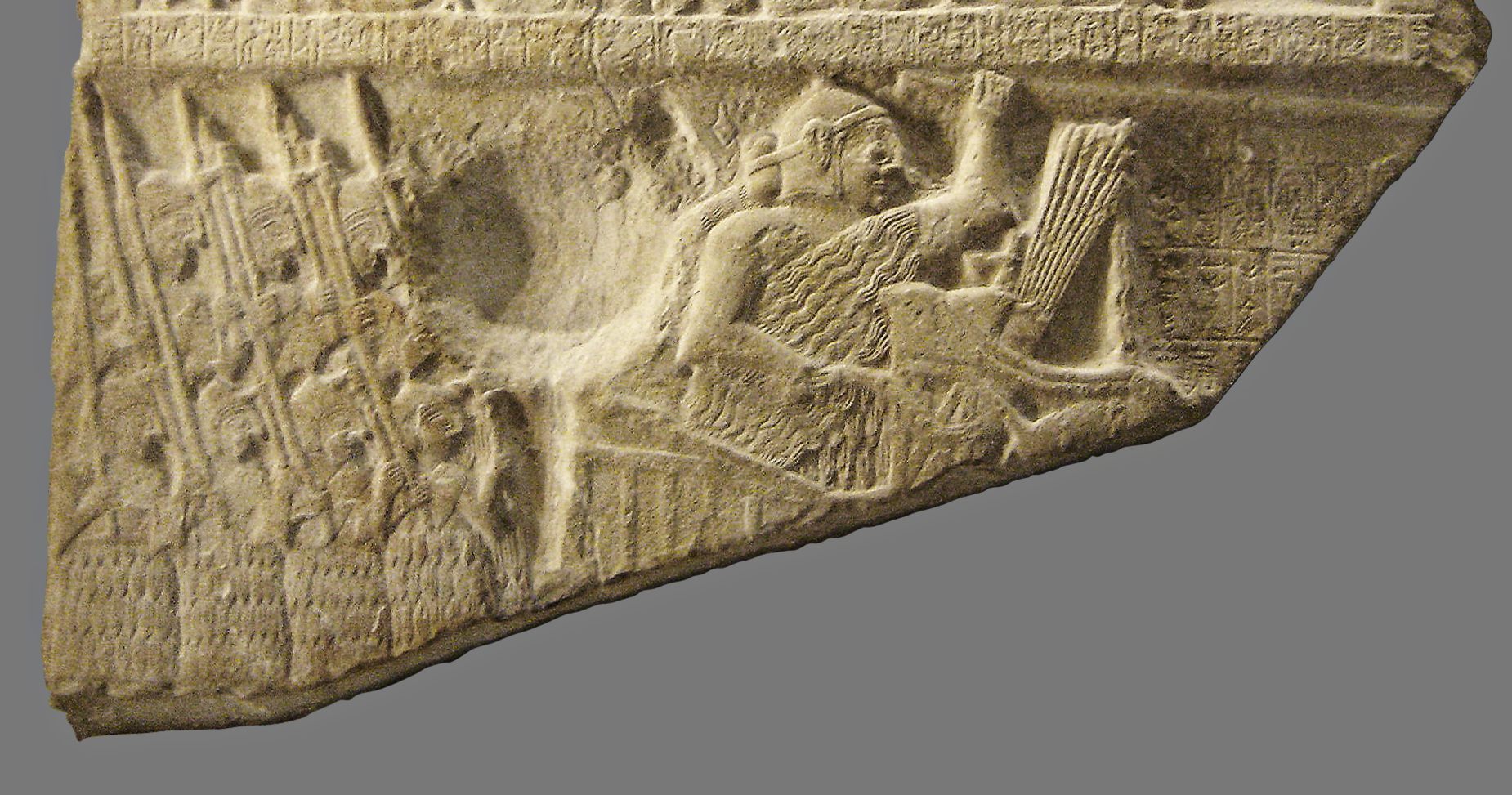
Detail of the "battle" fragment

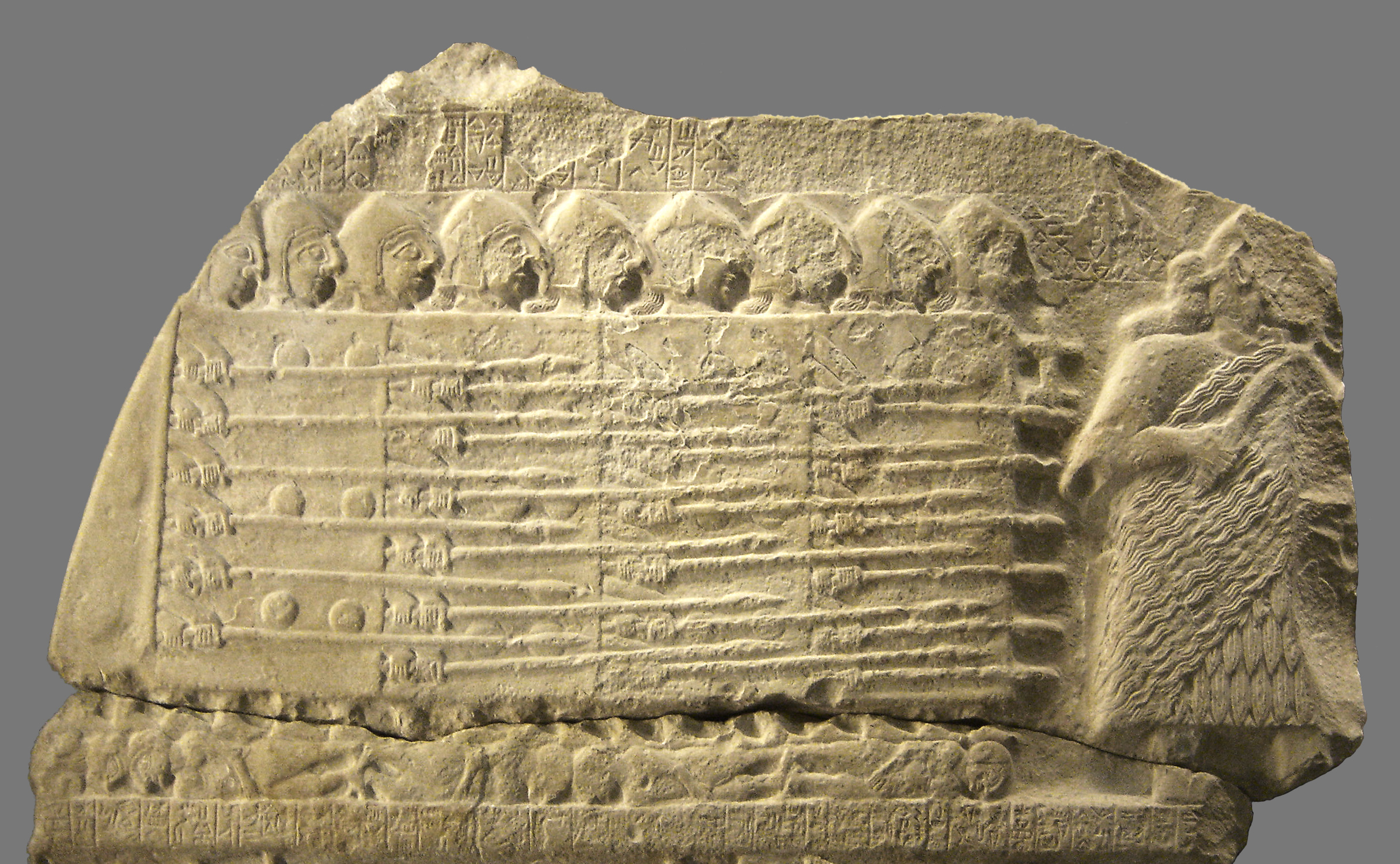
Detail of the "battle" fragment

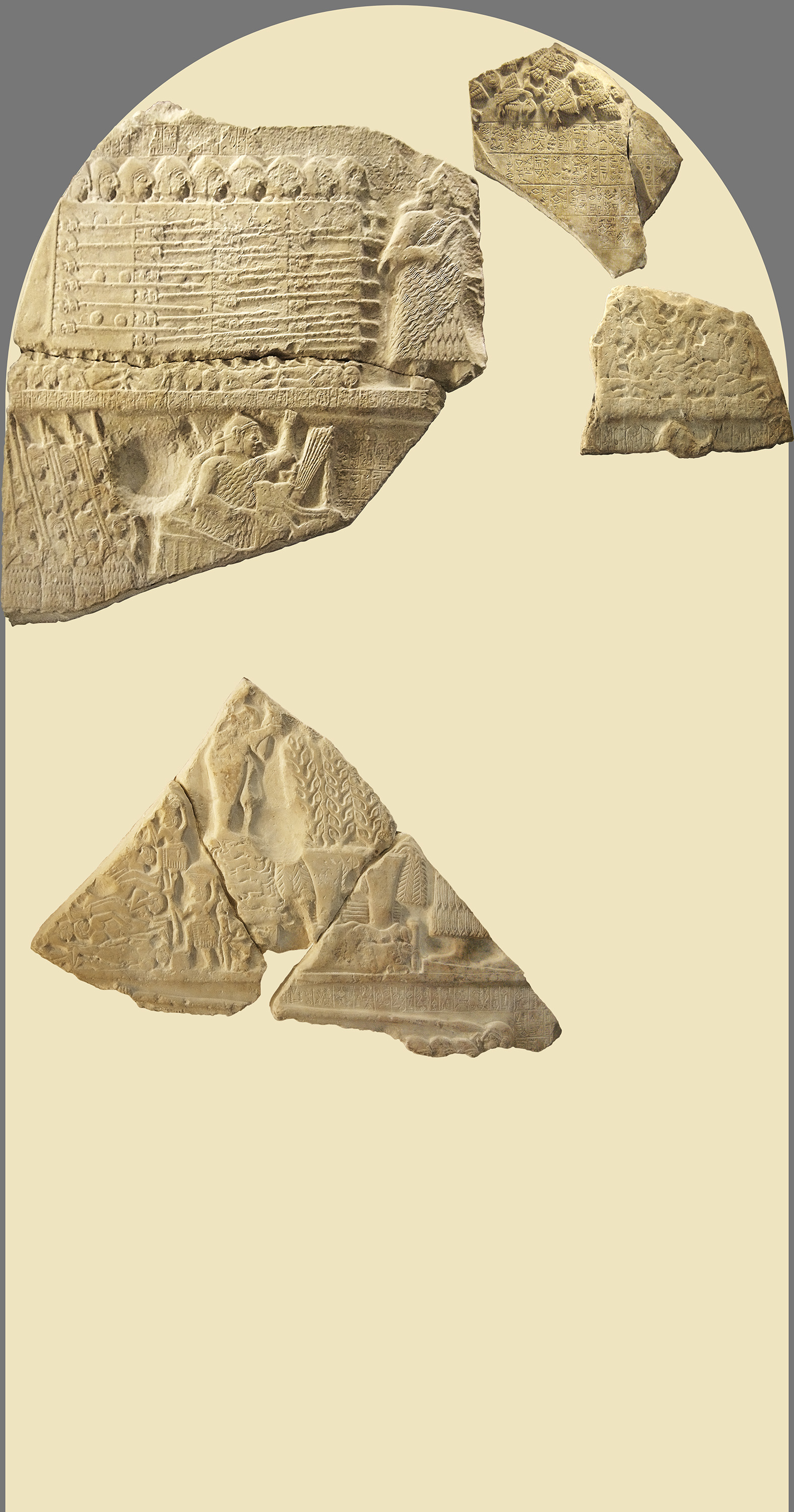
Reconstruction of the layout of the "historical" side

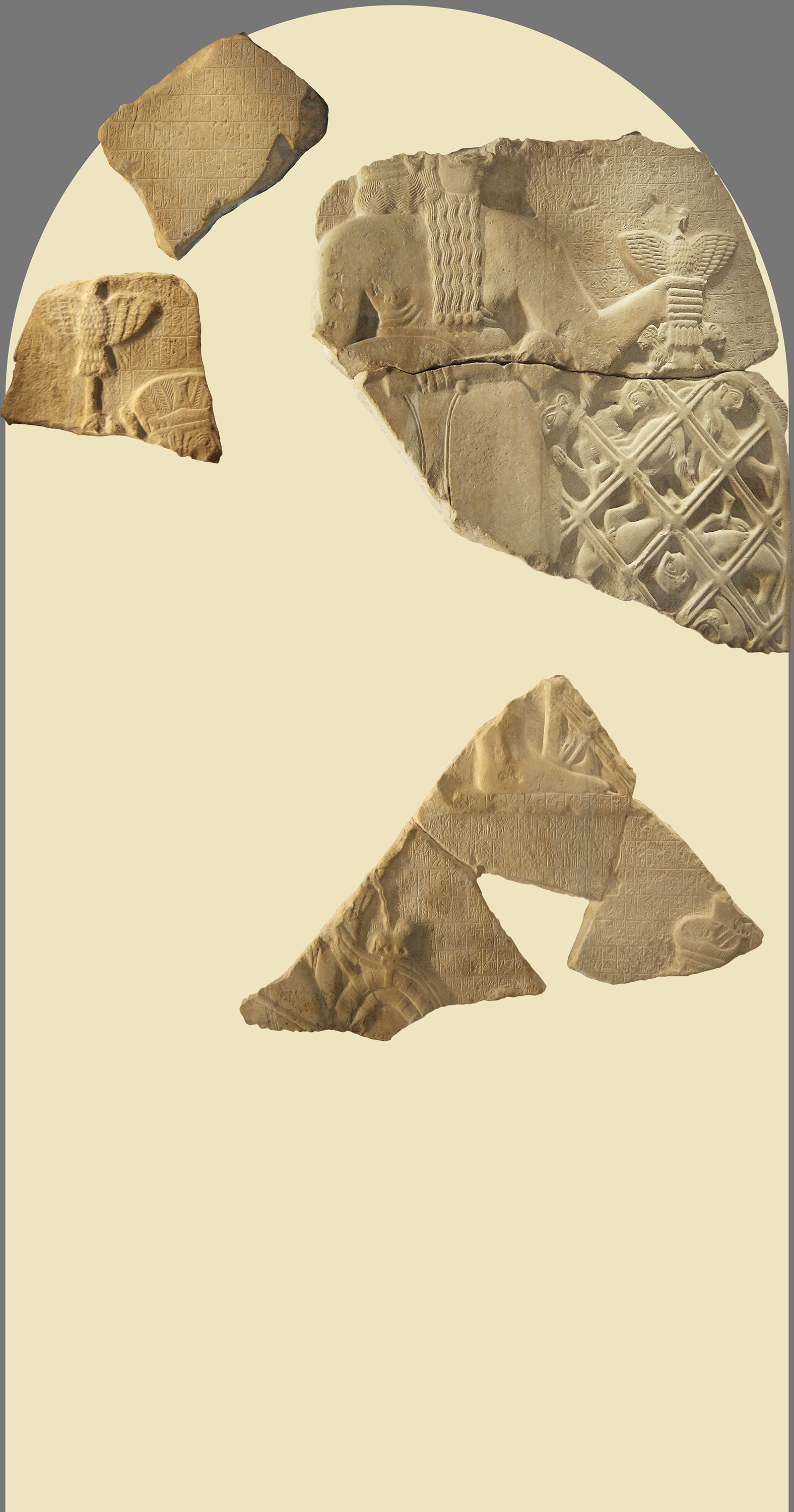
Reconstruction of the layout of the "mythological" side

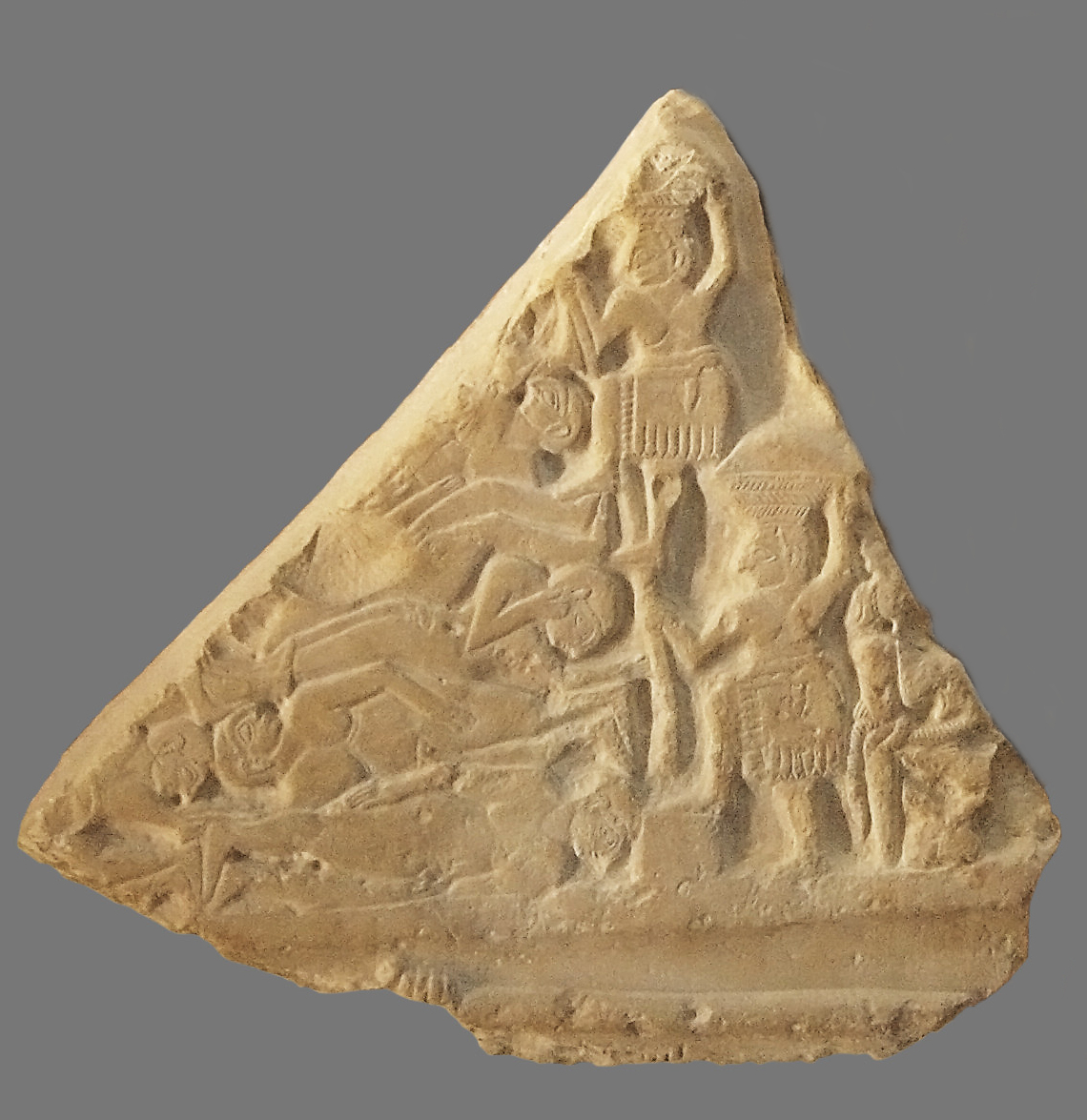
Building funeral mounds, Stele of the Vultures

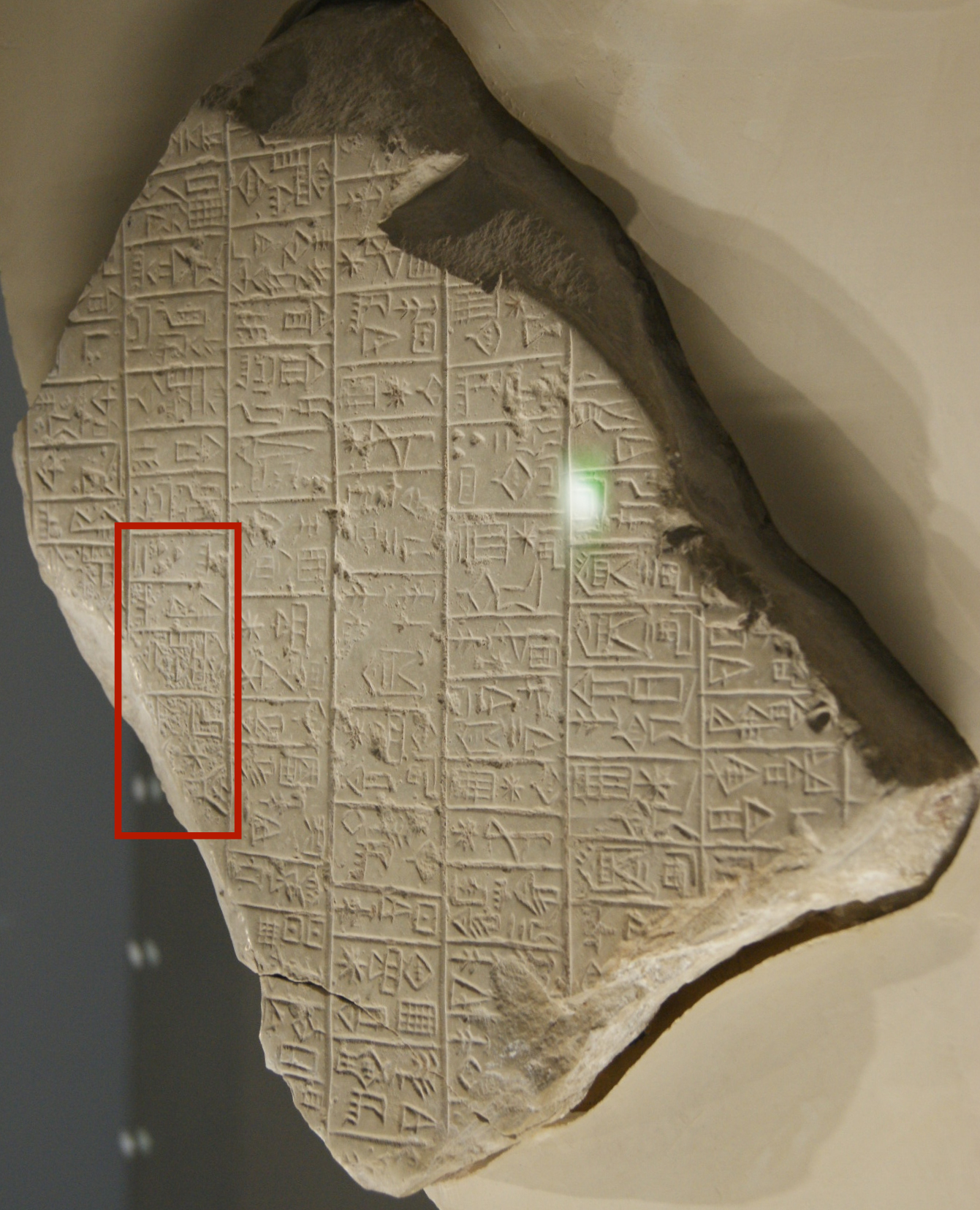
Inscription "Akurgal king of Lagash, son of Ur-Nanshe" (𒀀𒆳𒃲 𒈗 𒉢𒁓𒆷𒆠 𒌉 𒌨𒀭𒀏).

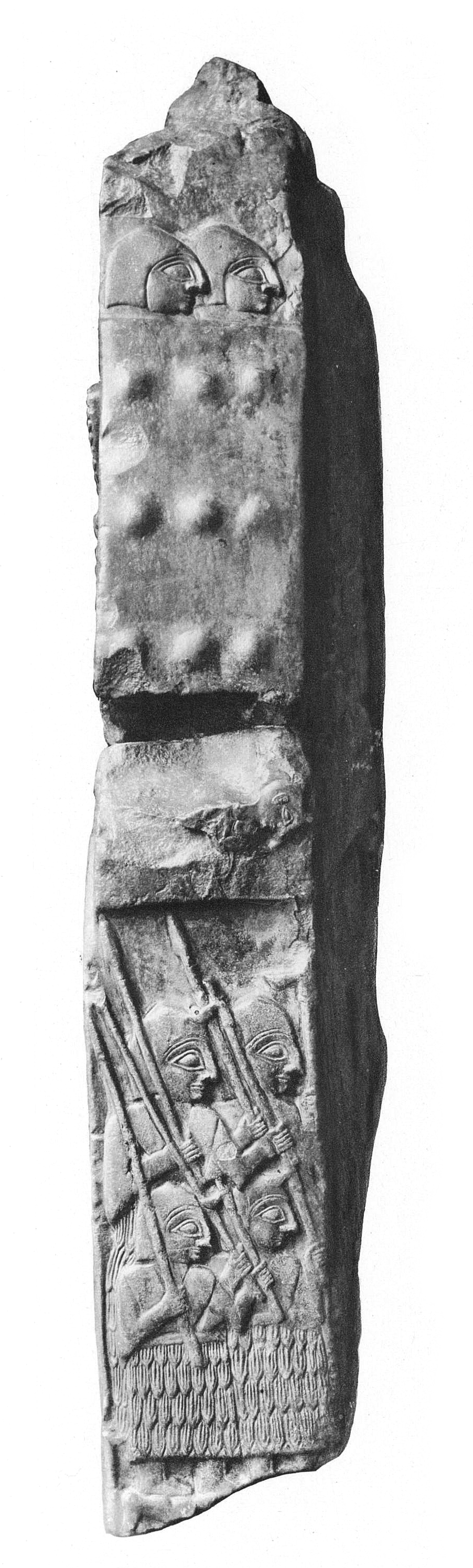
Second scene with Sumerian army
