= Nin-kisalsi =

Sumerian ruler

Nin-kisalsi 𒎏𒆦𒋛
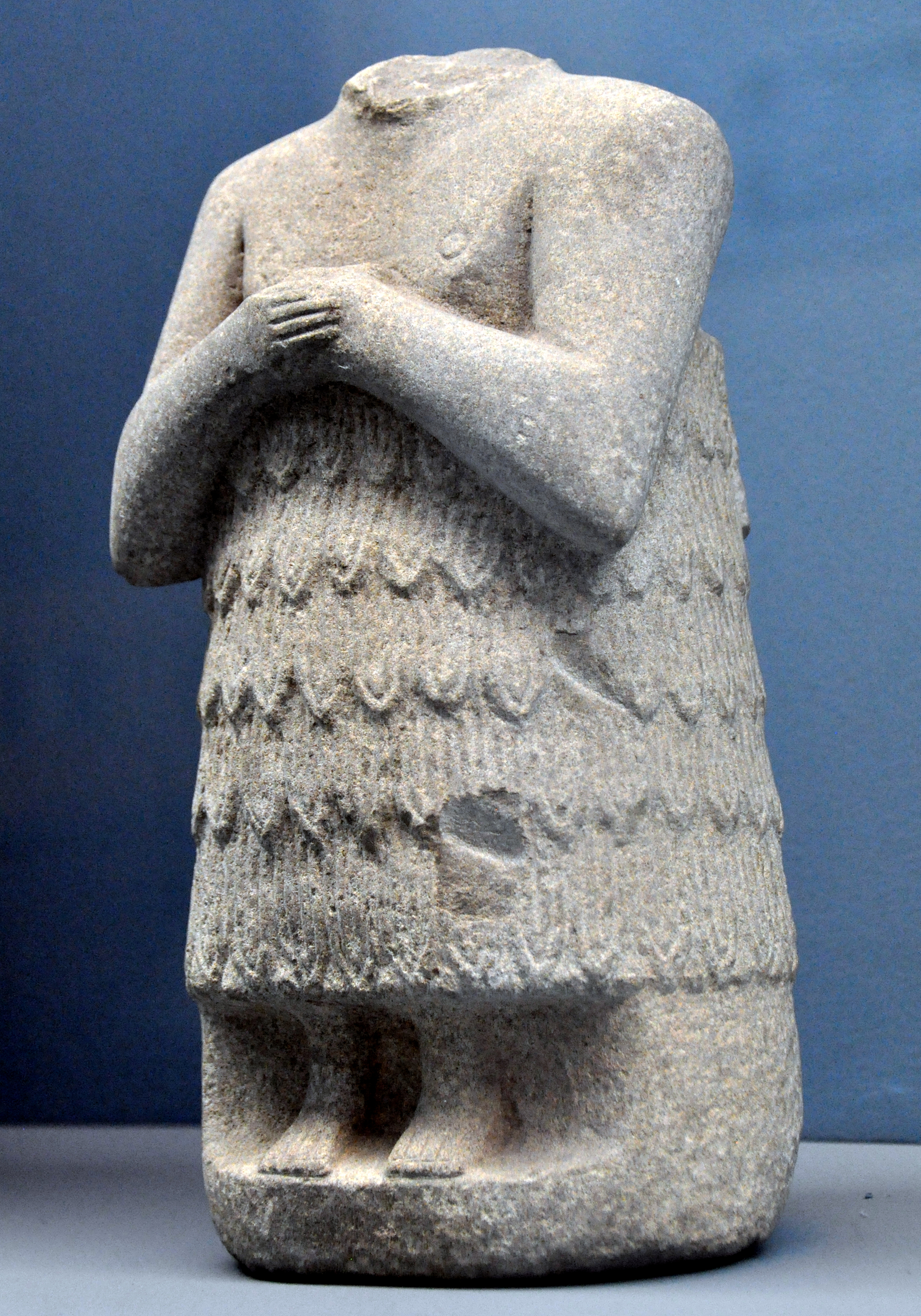
- Headless votive statue, from Adab, Iraq, early dynastic period. Museum of the Ancient Orient, Istanbul.

King of Adab
- Reign: c. 2500 BC
- Dynasty: Dynasty of Adab
- Religion: Sumerian religion

Location of Adab

Nin-kisalsi (Sumerian: 𒎏𒆦𒋛; fl. c. 2500 BC) was a Sumerian ruler of the Mesopotamian city of Adab in the mid-3rd millennium BC.

His name does not appear in the Sumerian King List, but he is known from one inscription bearing his name. The inscription, on a bowl fragment, reads:

𒈨𒁲 𒈗𒆧𒆠/ 𒂍𒊬 𒁓 𒈬𒄄 / 𒎏𒆦𒋛 𒑐𒋼𒋛 𒌓𒉣

me-silim lugal kisz e2-sar bur mu-gi4 nin-KISAL-si ensix(GAR.PA.TE.SI) adab
"Me-silim, king of Kish, to the Esar temple sent over (this) bowl (for the burgi ritual (Note: The bur-gi 4 (lit., “returning the stone bowls”) was a special rite consisting of bringing back the bowls of the temple after they had been filled with beer and/or food offerings (cf. PSD B 186 s.v. bur-gi 4 -a).)). Nin-KISALsi, (was) the governor of Adab." |Inscription of Mesilim mentioning Nin-Kisalsi

It appears from this inscription that King Mesilim of Kish was a contemporary with Nin-kisalsi and probably his suzerain. Another such ruler is Lugalshaengur, Governor of Lagash, who also appears in inscriptions as a vassal of Mesilim.
