= Lugalshaengur =

Lugalshaengur 𒈗𒊮𒇉
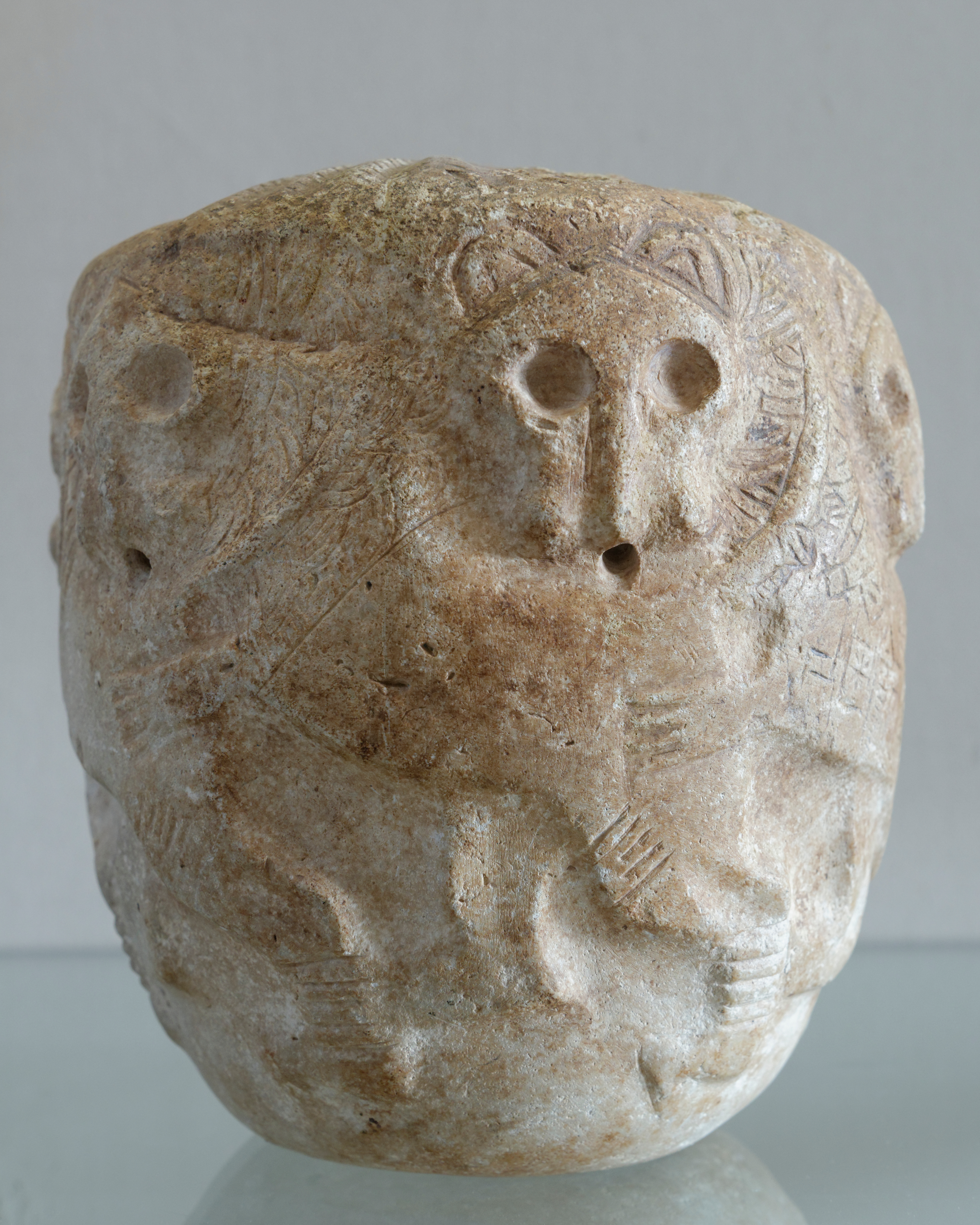
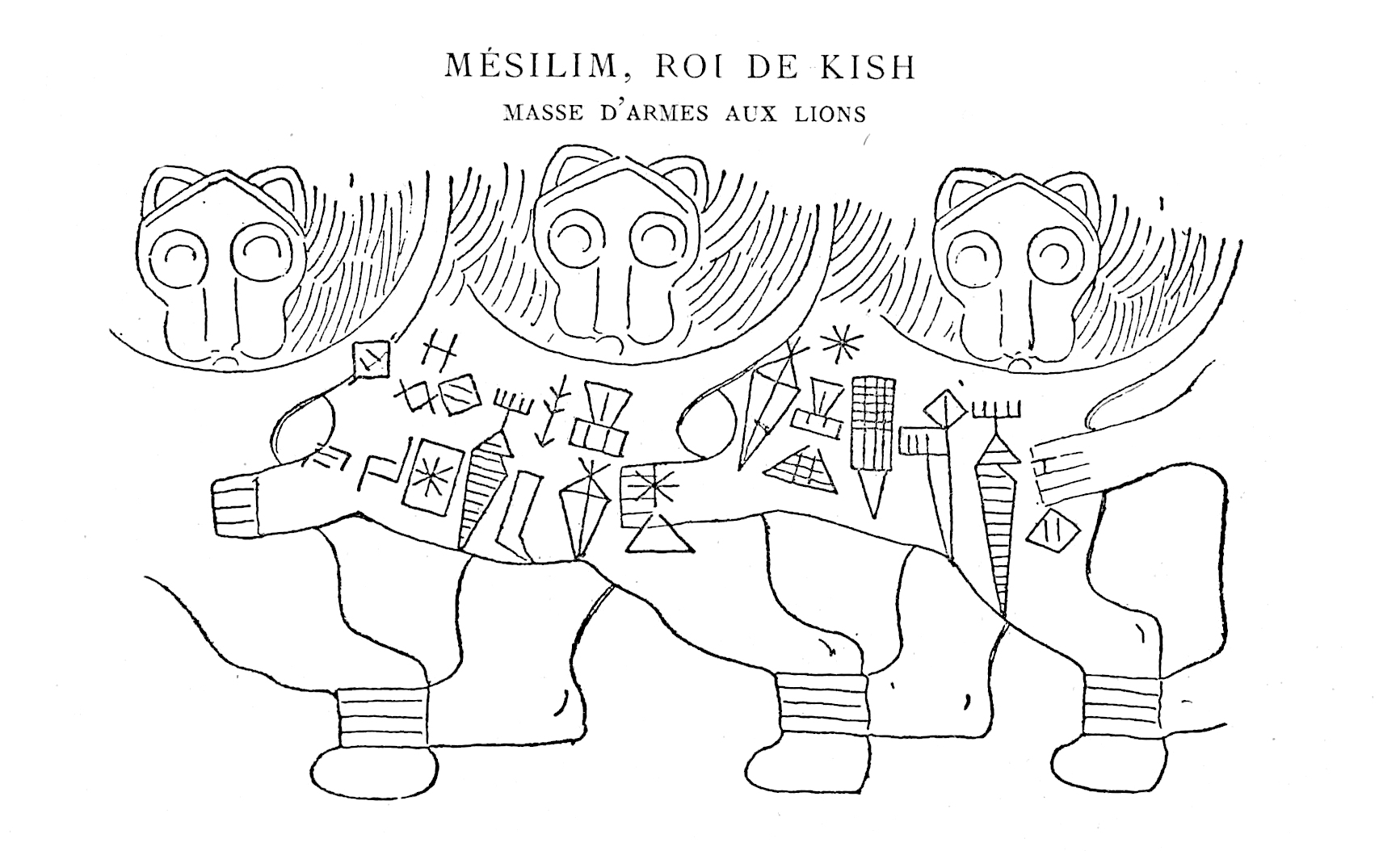
- Head of a votive mace with a lion-headed eagle (emblem of god Ningirsu) and six lions, dedicated at a shrine in Girsu by King Mesilim of Kish. Inscription in archaic script: “Mesilim, king of Kish, builder of the temple of Ningirsu, brought [this mace head] for Ningirsu, Lugalshaengur [being] prince of Lagash”. Louvre Museum.

King of Lagash
- Reign: c. 2530 BC
- Predecessor: Possibly En-hegal
- Successor: Possibly Ur-Nanshe
- Dynasty: 1st dynasty of Lagash

Location of Lagash

Lugalshaengur (Sumerian: 𒈗𒊮𒇉, Lugal-sha_{3}-engur), (fl. c. 2530 BC), was ensi (governor) of the Sumerian city-state of Lagash.

The First dynasty of Lagash is dated to the 25th century BCE. Lugalshaengur was tributary to Mesilim. Following the hegemony of Mesannepada of Ur, Ur-Nanshe succeeded Lugalshaengur as the new high priest of Lagash and achieved independence, making himself king. He defeated Ur and captured the king of Umma, Pabilgaltuk.

Lugalshaengur is known by an inscription on the head of a mace dedicated by King Mesilim of Kish, who was therefore contemporary with him.

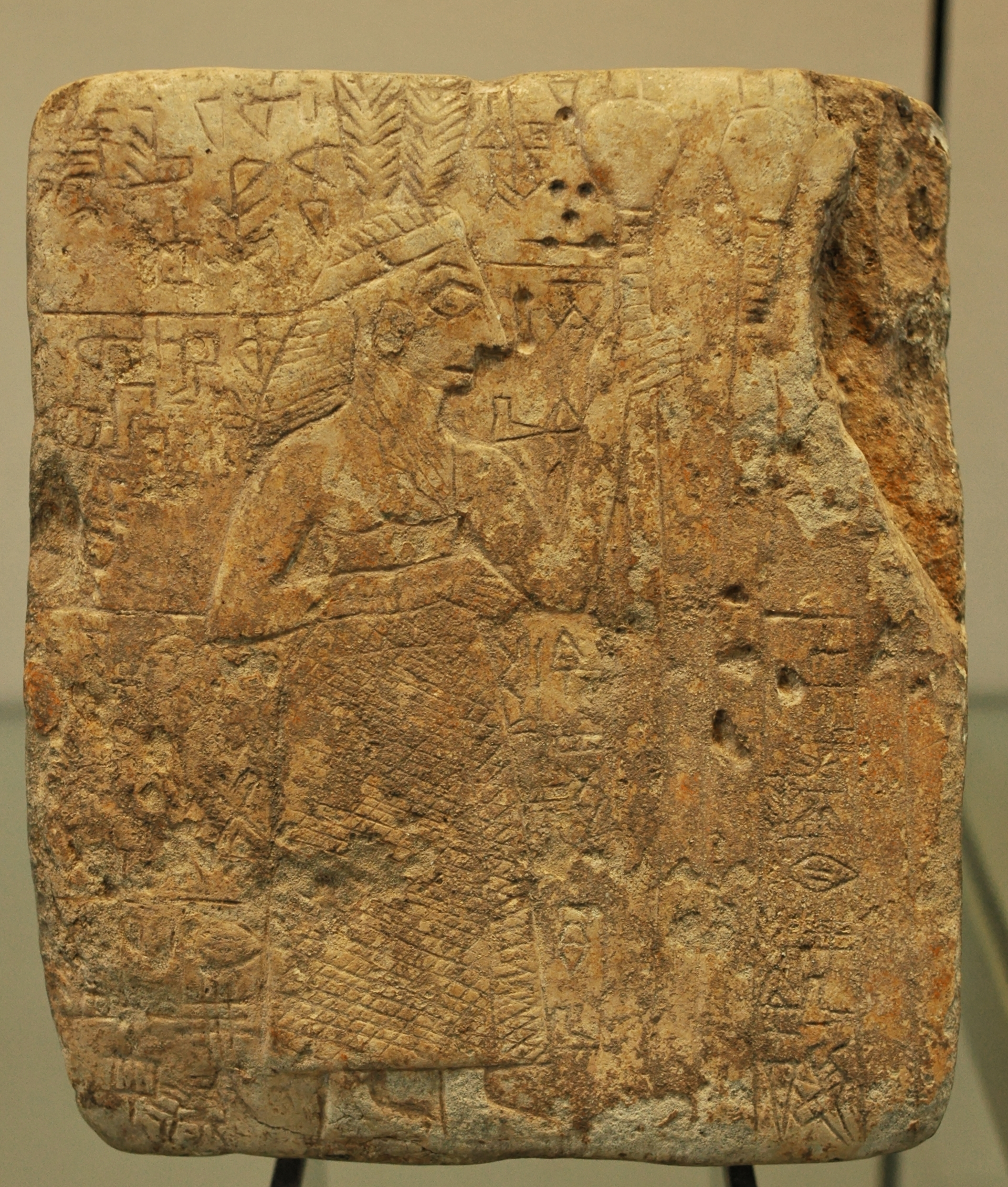
King priest on a votive tablet to Ningirsu, around the time of Lugalshaengu, before Ur-Nanshe. Found in Girsu, near Lagash. Louvre Museum.

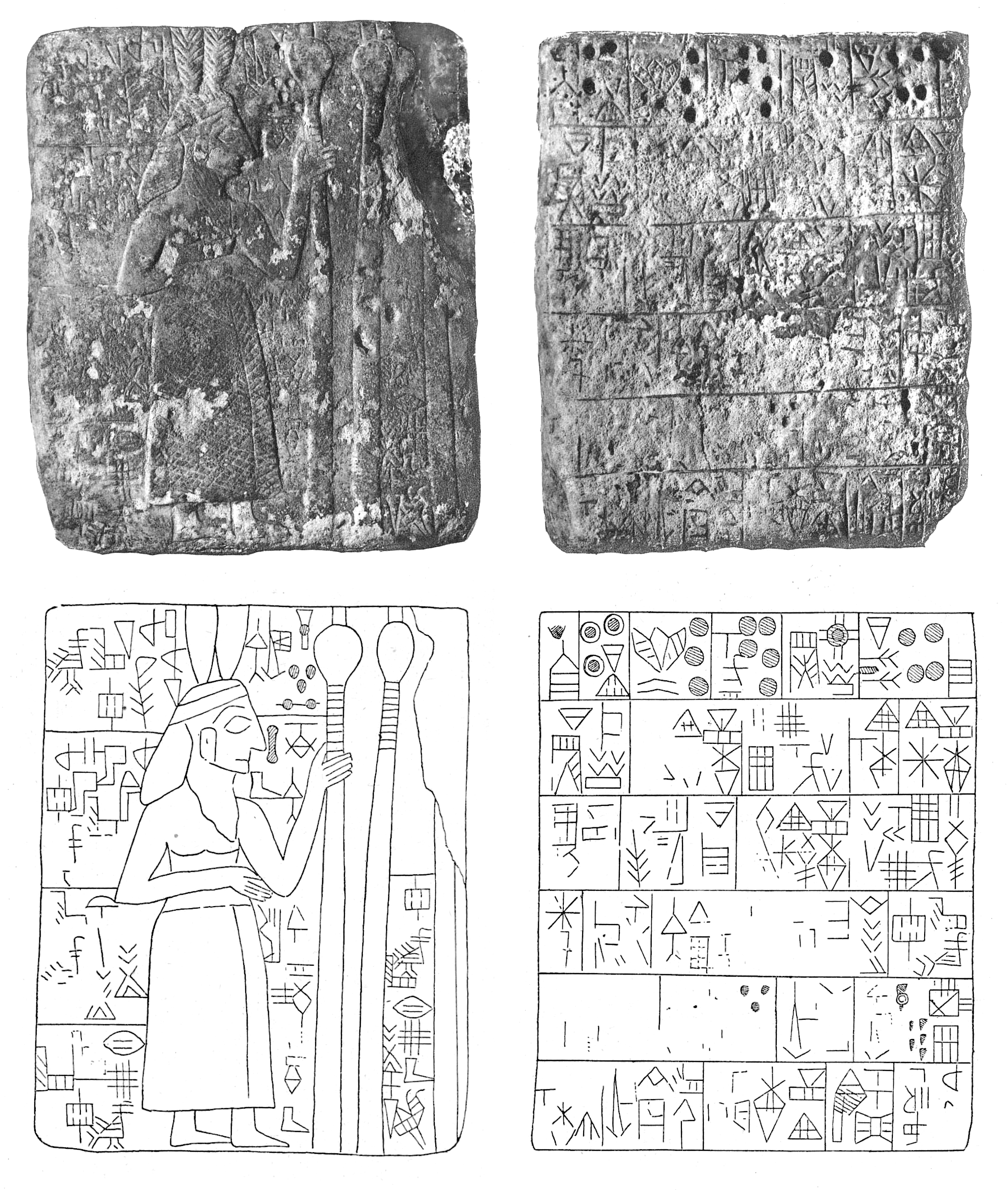
Transcription of the tablet.

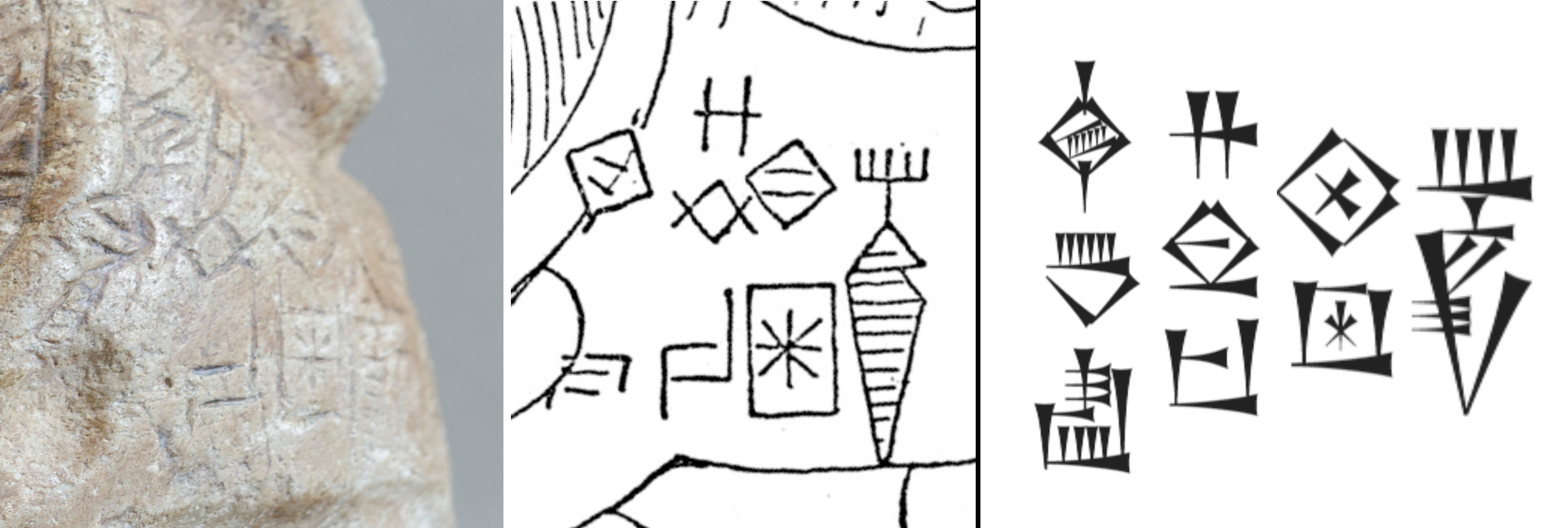
Fragmentary inscription Lugalshaengur Ensi Lagash (Sumerian: 𒈗𒊮𒇉 𒑐𒋼𒋛 𒉢𒁓𒆷), "Lugalshaengur, Governor of Lagash" on the mace of Mesilim

== See also ==
- History of Sumer

== Bibliography ==
- Vojtech Zamarovský, Na počiatku bol Sumer, Mladé letá, 1968 Bratislava
- Plamen Rusev, Mesalim, Lugal Na Kish: Politicheska Istoriia Na Ranen Shumer (XXVIII-XXVI V. Pr. N. E.), Faber, 2001 (LanguageBulgarian) [(Mesalim, Lugal of Kish. Political History of Early Sumer (XXVIII–XXVI century BC.)]

Regnal titles
| Preceded by Possibly En-hegal | King of Lagash c. 2530 BC | Succeeded by Possibly Ur-Nanshe |
