= Nin-MAR.KI =

Mesopotamian goddess

- Goddess of oaths, cattle and long distance trade
- Major cult center: Guabba, later Ašdubba
- Parents: Nanshe and Nindara

Nin-MAR.KI was a Mesopotamian goddess. The reading and meaning of her name remain uncertain, though options such as Ninmar and Ninmarki can be found in literature. In the past the form Ninkimar was also in use. She was considered the divine protector of cattle, and additionally functioned as an oath deity. She might have been associated with long distance trade as well. It is possible that in art she was depicted in the company of birds, similar to her mother Nanshe. Other deities associated with her include other members of the pantheon Lagash, such as Dumuzi-abzu and Hendursaga.

Guabba, a city in the territory of Lagash which functioned as a sea port, was Nin-MAR.KI's main cult center. She was also venerated in other settlements in the same area, such as Girsu. In later periods, she was venerated in Ašdubba, possibly also located in the same area. Attestations from other parts of Mesopotamia are infrequent. After the decline of her cult centers, she is only attested in god lists and laments, such as Lament for Ur.

== Name ==
The reading of the theonym ^{d}Nin-MAR.KI or ^{d}Nin-MAR is uncertain. The latter form is older, and appears chiefly in sources from the Fara period, with later attestations being rare, while the former is first known from the inscriptions of Ur-Nanshe. Both could be used interchangeably, as evidenced by the use of both to render the theophoric element in the names of the same individuals mentioned in texts of Lagash. However, there is also some evidence that in certain cases the name Nin-MAR refers to a different deity, and Gebhard J. Selz goes as far as suggesting no certain attestations of Nin-MAR.KI are available from before Ur-Nanshe's reign. Walther Sallaberger argues one of the Zame Hymns from Abu Salabikh is a possible example, as individual copies alternate between two theonyms, Nin-MAR and Nin-ŠITA_{3}, the latter meaning "mistress of the water channel", in the same passage. However, Joan Goodnick Westenholz assumed that Nin-MAR from the Zame Hymns is the same goddess as Nin-MAR.KI. A theonym attested in a single text from Umma, ^{d}Nin-mar-KA-ra-ka, despite the similarity is assumed to not be a further alternate writing of Nin-MAR.KI's name, as the latter is entirely absent from the sources from this city.

While a phonetic reading of the name, Ninmarki, can be found in Assyriological publications, according to Sallaberger it is implausible due to the interchange between the long and short forms. In early scholarship, the sign KI in ^{d}Nin-MAR.KI was usually interpreted as a determinative used to designate geographical terms in cuneiform, which lead to the widespread assumption that the name should be read as Ninmar, and the consensus was that is an example of a typical Sumerian theonym consisting of a sign meaning "lord" or "lady" and the name of a place. Examples of such names include Ningirsu and Ninisina. In the 1950s Edmond Sollberger instead suggested the sign sequence MAR.KI should be understood as ki-mar and on this basis translated the name, transcribed by him as Ninkimar, as "lady of the dwelling." Robert M. Whiting in 1985 challenged Sollberger's interpretation, and relying on the variable use of older form ^{d}Nin-MAR and newer ^{d}Nin-MAR.KI interpreted MAR as a toponym, though one no longer used in historical times, possibly referring to an abandoned prehistoric settlement close to the sea coast. He accordingly argues the name should be written as ^{d}Nin-Mar^{ki}. The form Ninmar has been subsequently employed by authors such as Andrew R. George and Odette Boivin. A different view has been suggested by Walther Sallaberger, who argues that a correct reading cannot be established and renders the name as Nin-MAR.KI, with the final sign understood as a possible sound indicator referring to an early alternate value of the sign MAR which was already no longer in use in the Old Babylonian period. Jeremiah Peterson cites Whiting's and Sallaberger's arguments as the two theories accepted in scholarship today but does not designate either as more plausible. The Reallexikon der Assyriologie und Vorderasiatischen Archäologie entry of this goddess, written by Sallaberger, renders her name as Nin-MAR.KI according to his theory. However, other authors, for example Antoine Cavigneaux and Manfred Krebernik, in entries they have contributed to the same encyclopedia alternate between Ninmar, Ninmarki and Nin-MAR.KI. Other authors who choose to render the name in a way reflecting the ambiguity include Julia M. Asher-Greve and Gebhard J. Selz.

Much like its reading, the meaning of the name Nin-MAR.KI is uncertain. It is possible that it was no longer understood by ancient scribes, as writings interpreted as mistakes or attempts at explaining it through folk etymologies, such as ^{d}Nin-mar-ra ("lady of the shovel") are attested in later sources. Sallaberger notes that even the name's grammatical structure is difficult to ascertain, as the theophoric name ^{d}Nin-MAR.KI-ga due to the suffix used makes it implausible that it was understood as "mistress from/of MAR.KI," as often assumed.

The uncertain reading of Nin-MAR.KI's name is also responsible for the fact that an early ensi of Eshnunna is referred to as both Ur-Ninmar and Ur-Ninmarki in modern scholarship.

It is possible that in one of the Temple Hymns Nin-MAR.KI appears under the name Ninĝagia, "mistress of the cloister." However, elsewhere, for example in offering lists from the Ur III period, this theonym designates an independent deity who might have had a temple in Nippur and who was in one case equated with Gula. In the text in which she might correspond to Nin-MAR.KI she is described as the "chief housekeeper" (agrig-maḫ) of Guabba.

== Character and iconography ==
Many texts attest an association existed between Nin-MAR.KI and cattle, and it is assumed she was a divine protector of these animals. It has been pointed out that the marshlands surrounding Guabba were likely a very suitable environment for raising cattle, which might have influenced the character of the local goddess. According to Joan Goodnick Westenholz, her other primary role was that of an oath deity. However, she only fulfilled it between the Ur III and Old Babylonian periods. It is first attested in sources from Girsu, where cattle herders swore oaths in her temple, and later on in is mentioned in texts from the kingdom of Larsa. Based on texts from Lagash it is also assumed that she could function as a Lamma goddess, a type of benevolent protective deity. Furthermore, it has been suggested that Nin-MAR.KI was also associated with long distance trade. Gebhard J. Selz argues that her epithet munus gi_{16}-sa might be related to this role.

It is possible that due to the association between Nin-MAR.KI and Nanshe, the symbols of the latter, birds, could also accompany depictions of the former too. A possible example of the association between the former and these animals is a seal with a depiction of an unidentified large bird inscribed with her name.

== Associations with other deities ==
Nin-MAR.KI was considered to be a daughter of Nanshe. She was directly referred to as her first child (dumu saĝ). While this familial relation is mentioned for the first time in texts from the reign of Gudea, it is assumed it was older. Her father was Nanshe's husband Nindara, though Walther Sallaberger notes that he appears to play no specific role in relation to her in known sources.

In Nina, Nin-MAR.KI was worshiped alongside deities such as Hendursaga and Dumuzi-abzu, and it is possible a special, though not fully understood, connection existed between her and the latter. She also often appears in offering lists alongside the deity ^{d}Nin-MÙŠ-bad, who might have functioned as her husband, though no direct evidence for this common modern assumption is available in any known primary sources. Sallaberger argues that he might have been viewed as another of Nanshe's children at an early point in time. Other deities worshiped alongside Nin-MAR.KI include Nadua, the deification of a stele, and Igiamaše, whose name means "before the mother," who according to Selz might have been her daughter, though Sallaberger considers this relation to be uncertain.

The god list An = Anum, which most likely dates to the Kassite period, mentions a group depending on the copy labeled as the "ten children of Nin-MAR.KI" or "the thirteen children of Nin-MAR.KI." In the same text, a goddess named Nin-Anzu, ^{d}NIN-^{d}IM.DUGUD^{mušen}, appears as the ĝud balag (literally "bull lyre") of Nin-MAR.KI. Uri Gabbay points out that the same cuneiform signs also functioned as a logographic representation of the Akkadian word mundalku, which can be translated "counselor" or "advisor," and also referred to a type of benevolent minor deity. A gloss present in a single source suggests that the sign NIN in Nin-Anzu's name is to be read as ereš or égi instead. Sallaberger therefore renders her name as NIN-Anzu.

No known sources indicate that Nin-MAR.KI was ever equated with any other deities, and she never developed strong connections with any members of the Mesopotamian pantheon from outside of the Lagash area.

== Worship ==
The worship of Nin-MAR.KI is best attested in sources from the territory of Lagash. Her cult center was Gu'abba ("seaside"), located to the southeast of Nina (Tell Zurghul). It was a sea port. Her temple located there, which was originally built by Ur-Nanshe, bore the name Eabšagala, "house which stretches over the midst of the sea." In the Temple Hymns, the section dedicated to it follows that focused on Sirara, a cult center of Nanshe. Attested members of the temple staff include a temple administrator (saĝĝa), lamentation singers (gala and gala-maḫ, "foremost gala"), snake charmers (muš-laḫ_{4}), and various musicians. The name of a further structure located in Guabba, which in the Early Dynastic period was the site of Nin-MAR.KI's main festival, is uncertain, with the two possible readings of its name due to variable value of the sign TÙR being Etur, "house, hurdle" or Ešilam, "house of cows," both of which fit the goddess' connection to cattle. The meaning of the name of the celebration itself, ezem amar-a-(a)-si-ge_{4}-de, is also unknown, though based on the fact that amar means "calf" in Sumerian it is presumed it was related to cattle. Gebhard J. Selz proposes the translation "festival during which calves were fertilized." In addition to the existence of temples dedicated to Nin-MAR.KI in the city, many fields located in the proximity of Guabba were named after her as well.

A temple of Nin-MAR.KI also existed in Girsu. It was considered the second most important sanctuary dedicated to her. It bore the ceremonial name Emunusgisa, "house of the bejeweled woman." Kings who mention it in their inscriptions include Ur-Ningirsu I, Gudea and Shulgi. It was rebuilt by the first and last of them. Attested members of clergy associated with it include a temple administrator and, during the reign of Gudea, lamentation singers. Nin-MAR.KI was also worshiped elsewhere in the state of Lagash, in its eponymous capital, as well as Nina and various dependencies of Guabba, such as Guabba-gula, Pa-Enku and Ḫurim. Her temple in the last of these settlements might have been the Ebarasiga, "house, low dais," though it cannot be ruled out that it was dedicated to another goddess worshiped there, referred to simply as Lamma.

Nin-MAR.KI is already attested in theophoric names from Lagash from the Early Dynastic period, such as Nin-MAR.KI-amamu ("Nin-MAR.KI is my mother") or Ur-Nin-MAR.KI. She is also well attested in names from this area from the Ur III period, but none appear in later sources In the Isin-Larsa period and the Old Babylonian period, the veneration of Nin-MAR.KI is only well attested in Ašdubba, which according to Walther Sallaberger might have been located in the proximity of Guabba. It is possible that it corresponds to earlier Išdubba, mentioned in documents from the Sargonic period. Rim-Sîn I of Larsa built a temple dedicated to her in this location. It is also attested in texts from the reigns of Sumuel and Abisare, which indicate that during a festival which also involved temples in Girsu and Bad-tibira oil rations were distributed to it. During the reign of Samsu-iluna it was managed from the latter of the aforementioned cities, and a priest designated as gudu_{4} (pašīšum) was responsible for it.

According to Walther Sallaberger, the only attestations of active worship of Nin-MAR.KI from outside the territory of Lagash are available from Larsa and Ur. However, according to Joan Goodnick Westenholz in the Early Dynastic period she was also venerated in Shuruppak. References to oath sworn by Nin-MAR.KI are known from Larsa, though the available attestations often pertain to the temple in Ašdubba. During the reign of the Larsa dynasty, a deity named ^{d}Nin-é-NIM-ma (reading of the name uncertain), possibly a member of the entourage of Ningal of indeterminate gender or a secondary name of this goddess, was worshiped in a shrine within a temple of Nin-MAR.KI, which according to Antoine Caivngeaux and Manfred Krebernik was located in Ur. This conclusion is supported by other authors, though Odette Boivin notes that there is no indication in known texts that a temple of this goddess existed in said city, and argues that it might have been located in Guabba instead.

While Nin-MAR.KI's mother Nanshe was later worshiped in the Sealand, there is no indication in known sources that any of her children also belonged to the local pantheon. Seemingly after the decline of Guabba and other settlements where Nin-MAR.KI was originally worshiped god lists, laments and other similar texts were the only sources preserving her name.

== Miscellaneous textual sources ==
Nin-MAR.KI appears in a number of god lists, including the Fara god list, where she is placed before Šumugan, possibly due to their shared association with domestic animals, the Abu Salabikh god list, where she is followed by Ninĝišgi, "mistress of the reed bed," possibly due to her association with bodies of water, the Old Babylonian Nippur god list, and the so-called "An = Anum forerunner," where she follows her mother Nanshe. While they also appear in the same section of An = Anum, Nanshe is not designated as Nin-MAR.KI's mother there, and it is possible the latter was placed among deities associated with the moon god Nanna because of her own association with cattle, which she shared with his traditional circle.

The composition Lament for Sumer and Ur, which was most likely inspired by the fall of the Third Dynasty of Ur, states that during the widespread destruction it describes, Nin-MAR.KI lost her temple in Guabba and that "boats were carrying off its silver and lapis lazuli." The same passage deals with the fate of Nanshe and the province of Lagash as a whole. She is also present in the Lament for Ur, where she similarly appears among deities from the pantheon of Lagash, such as Nanshe, Gatumdug and Dumuzi-abzu.
