= Zame Hymns =

Collection of Sumerian hymns

Zame Hymns or Zami Hymns are a sequence of 70 Sumerian hymns from the Early Dynastic period discovered in Abu Salabikh. Their conventional title is modern, and reflects the recurring use of the formula zame, "praise". They are the oldest known Mesopotamian collection of hymns, and some of the oldest literary cuneiform texts overall. No copies have been discovered outside Abu Salabikh, and it is possible that they reflect a local tradition. However, partial parallels have been identified in texts associated with other sites such as Fara and Kesh.

The sequence consists of 70 hymns, each of which is dedicated to a deity associated with a specific location. Most of them belonged to the pantheon of southern Mesopotamia, with northern deities being less numerous and these from more distant areas like Ebla, Mari and Susa absent altogether. While the first eleven hymns are dedicated to major, well attested deities such as Enlil, Inanna, Nanna or Ningal, some of the others are sparsely attested and their character is poorly understood.

Due to structural similarities it has been suggested that the Zame Hymns influenced the later Temple Hymns, traditionally attributed to Enheduanna.

== Name ==
The modern name of the Zame Hymns is derived from the Sumerian word za_{3}-me. It should not be considered a name of a distinct literary genre. It is derived from a phrase which recurs in all of the hymns, identified as an early form of later za_{3}-mi_{2}, "praise". The title has been coined by Robert D. Biggs at the time of their first publication in 1974.

The designation of the individual sections of the composition, as hymns, while conventional, is sometimes criticized due to their length, as some consist of only two lines. However, sometimes the entire sequence is referred to as a singular hymn.

== Overview ==
The Zame Hymns are the oldest known collection of Mesopotamian hymns, and have been dated to Early Dynastic IIIa period. More precise dating is not possible.

Alongside compositions from Fara discovered in 1902 and 1903, the Zame Hymns have been described by Robert D. Biggs as "testimonies of the first great flowering of Sumerian literature". However, according to Manfred Krebernik and Jan Lisman literary texts, while overall more recent than administrative and lexical ones, must have already been composed earlier, possibly in the Uruk III period, as the text corpora from Fara and Abu Salabikh already show the existence of shared conventions, and in some cases the same compositions are known from more than one Early Dynastic site.

No copies of the Zame Hymns have been discovered outside Abu Salabikh. However, they are not entirely isolated, and a number of passages with parallels to them have been identified in other contemporary texts, which might indicate all were derived from shared oral tradition.

Mark E. Cohen proposed shortly after the original publication of the hymns that they were composed in Abu Salabikh. He suggested that Lisin occurs as the final deity praised in them because she was the tutelary goddess of Abu Salabikh. Support for this view has more recently been voiced by Krebernik and Lisman, who argue that based on Lisin's position in the hymns and the possible identification of her cult center as Abu Salabikh, it can be assumed that they were originally composed in this city to celebrate the foundation of her temple. They speculate they might have been performed when this event was reenacted during a cyclical (possibly annual) festival, but stress that this cannot be established with certainty. Nicholas J. Postgate disagrees with their arguments, as according to him the fact Lisin's cult center is the final city mentioned does not necessarily prove the hymns were composed there. (Note: Postgate instead assumes Abu Salabikh should be identified as Ereš, the cult center of Nisaba. However, the location of this city remains a matter of debate in Assyriology, and while it is accepted that it might have been located in the proximity of Kish and Nippur, a southern location between Shuruppak and Uruk is also regarded as possible.)

A different view has been advanced by Douglas Frayne, who argued that since both the second and second to last hymns focus on Uruk or Kullaba, the toponyms listed might represent the full territorial extent of an area which at some point was under the control of this city. He proposed that scribes composed them under the patronage of a ruler of Uruk, similarly to how the later Temple Hymns traditionally attributed to Enheduanna might have been composed on behalf of Sargon of Akkad with the aim of delineating the extent of the Akkadian Empire. Since cities in the proximity of Lagash are mentioned in the hymns, he assumes they were originally compiled before the rise of Ur-Nanshe to power, as it is known that from that time up to the reign of Urukagina the area was independent from Uruk.

Joan Goodnick Westenholz assumed that the Zame Hymns were composed for both theological and political reasons, as a reflection of the existence of an "amphictyonic" organization centered on Nippur, due to the prominent position of this city and its tutelary god Enlil.

== Discovery and publication ==
The Zame Hymns first became known to Assyriologists in 1966, after the publication of preliminary results of excavations of Abu Salabikh by Robert D. Biggs. The excavations were conducted in 1963 and 1965 by a team from the Oriental Institute of the University of Chicago, with participation of representatives of the Iraqi Directorate General for Antiquities.

All of the known copies come from Abu Salabikh. A total of 24 tablets and fragments have been identified; it is assumed that at least some of the latter belong to the same tablets, but it is nonetheless agreed that at least seven different copies have been excavated. With the exception of a single fragment which might not belong to the composition, all of the copies were found in the same room, which might have served as the scriptorium of a temple. However, the tablets were not scribal exercises, as evidenced by their large size and the fact they were copied by experienced scribes, some of whom added colophons. Five survive, with a total of seventeen individuals presumably involved in the preparation of the tablets mentioned in them. Other texts discovered in the same room include the myths Lugalbanda and Ninsumuna and Ezina and her children, the Abu Salabikh god list (in multiple copies) and numerous examples of UD.GAL.NUN.

Biggs published the first modern edition of the hymns in 1974, though he stressed that it should only be considered the first step in the process of translating them. The first hymn has been subsequently translated by multiple other researchers, though the rest of the corpus attracted less attention. A new edition of the full sequence of hymns has been completed by Manfred Krebernik and Jan Lisman in 2020, though they also state that it should not be considered definitive, as uncertainties over correct translation of multiple passages remain due to the fact the order of signs might not necessarily reflect grammar and syntax in Early Dynastic texts.

== Contents ==
70 individual hymns of variable length (from 2 to 12 lines) have been identified. It is not known if this number has any special significance in the Early Dynastic period, but later sources do not indicate that 70 was a number with any specific importance in Mesopotamian religion. The text of the hymns is uniform overall, and very few passages have variants.

While some of the texts discovered in Abu Salabikh follow the unusual UD.GAL.NUN orthography, the Zame Hymns, much like the copies of Instructions of Shuruppak and the Kesh temple hymn from this site, represent conventional Sumerian similar to that later used in Old Babylonian scribal schools. They are nonetheless considered difficult to translate, as in the Early Dynastic period cuneiform signs were not yet necessarily arranged in sequence in accordance with the lexical and morphological units they represented. Suffixes, postpositions, verbal morphemes and some determinatives (especially ki, used to designate toponyms) are left out, which might indicate the texts served as a memory aid for individuals already familiar with the hymns.

Most of the hymns start with a toponym and its description. Each concludes with a formula consisting of a theonym and the phrase za_{3}-me. Most likely za_{3}-me in this context should be interpreted as za_{3}-me mu-DUG_{3}, "(a deity) spoke praise".

Next to the god lists from Fara and Abu Salabikh, the hymns are considered the most important source of information about the pantheon and location of religious sites in lower Mesopotamia in the Early Dynastic period. The first 11 hymns focus on the most important deities (Enlil, Inanna, Ninirigal, Enki, Asalluḫi, Nanna, Utu, Ningal, An, Damgalnuna and Nin-UM) and their cult centers. Notable omissions include Bau, Dumuzi, (Note: Krebernik and Lisman list Dumuzi among the omitted deities and Ama'ušumgal among these included, and subsequently state that it is likely that the up to the end of the Sargonic period the former name designated Dumuzi-abzu and the latter Dumuzi.) Ninhursag, Ninlil, Ninurta, Nuska and Ningishzida. Additionally, comparatively few northern deities are mentioned, with only hymns from 12 to 17 being dedicated to them. This presumably reflects the perception of upper Mesopotamia as a "fringe" area in the south. However, Aage Westenholz notes that the inclusion of some of the northern deities like Zababa indicates that there was no systematic religious discrimination against their cults. More distant areas, like Ebla, Mari and Susa, are omitted altogether.

Of the deities listed, at least twenty five are male and at least thirty seven female, but due to scarcity of attestations gender of some of the others is impossible to determine. In some cases, goddesses are identified with feminine titles like lamma or ama, but they are not applied consistently. (Note: The literal translation of the word ama is "mother", but in this context it most likely only metaphorically designates goddesses as the tutelary deities of their cities.)

Robert D. Biggs assumed that the hymns should be interpreted as praise uttered by Enlil, the first god mentioned, in honor of the other deities. However, according to Manfred Krebernik and Jan Lisman the opposite is more likely, with Enlil being praised by other deities. Xianhua Wang notes that this view is overall more widespread among Assyriologists. A second possibility suggested by Krebernik and Lisman is that all of the deities are praised by mankind.

== List of hymns ==
Unless stated otherwise, the numbering of the hymns, toponyms and theonyms follow the table in Krebernik & Lisman 2020.

No.	Toponym	Theonym	Commentary
1	Nippur	Enlil	Nippur's placement reflects its position as the most important religious center of Early Dynastic Mesopotamia. Accordingly, Enlil is invoked first due to his position as the supreme deity of the pantheon. He is addressed with his common title Nunamnir, which remained in use through the second millennium BCE. The hymn also describes the assignment of cult places to major deities of the pantheon, referred to with the term Anunna.
2	Uruk-Kullaba	Ninirigal	The two toponyms listed in the second hymn, Uruk and Kullaba, are seemingly sometimes distinguished from each other in sources from the Uruk period, but it is agreed that Kullaba came to function as a distinct of Uruk before the Early Dynastic period already. Ninirigal was a major deity in the Early Dynastic period, as indicated by her position in the Zame Hymns and in the Fara god list, but her position declined later on. The reading Ninunug, "queen of Uruk", has also been proposed for the theonym.
3	Kullaba	Inanna	Inanna's temple Eanna was located in the Kullaba district of Uruk. She was already associated with Uruk in the Uruk period.
4	Eridu	Nudimmud (Enki)	The theonym is written as ^{d}nu-TE-mud rather than ^{d}nu-dim_{2}-mud, but it is agreed that the common title of Enki is meant.
5	Kuara	Asalluḫi	The theonym is written as ^{d}asar-lu_{2}-KALAG, but it is agreed that it is an early form of the name Asalluḫi (later conventionally ^{d}asar-lu_{2}-ḫi).
6	Ur	Nanna	The hymn associates Nanna and his cult center with "fragrant herbs", but this connection is not paralleled by any other sources.
7	^{GIŠ}GAL.NÍNDA×GUD (Ebabbar)	Utu	Reading of the toponym is uncertain. Manfred Krebernik and Jan Lisman suggest that the temple Ebabbar in Larsa is meant.
8	KI.NISIG	Ningal	The toponym and its presumed description can be literally translated as "the green place where princes are born", possibly a designation of Ur. Alternatively an identification with Kisar (possibly modern Abu Khadir), a nearby port known from sources the Ur III period, has been suggested. Ningal is referred to with the epithet ama.
9	Ugalgal	An	It is possible that the toponym refers to a "place of the assembly", though in this context it might be a designation of a temple of An in Uruk. Identification with Umm al-Wawiya has been suggested as well. In contrast with the early god lists, An's position in the Zame Hymns is inferior to that of Enlil. His role as the head of the pantheon was largely nominal, and he has been characterized as a deus otiosus in Assyriology.
10	Eridu	Damgalnuna	Damgalnuna's name means "great wife of the prince" (implicitly Enki), though the sign NUN was also used to write the toponym Eridu, which reflects her connection to this city.
11	Zabalam	^{d}nin-UM	The meaning of the theonym Nin-UM is unknown, and according to Joan Goodnick Westenholz it might have originally referred to an early city goddess of Zabalam, later identified with Inanna. Manfred Krebernik and Jan Lisman instead argue that it should be interpreted as an epithet of Inanna of Zabalam, possibly related to her early reed-shaped symbol as one of the attested meaning of UM is "reed rope" or "rush rope".
12	BU+BU.KALAM (Kiti)	Amgalnuna	The toponym might be an early writing of Kiti, a city known from Old Babylonian sources, as indicated by geographical lexical lists. The name of Amgalnuna ("princely wild bull") is written without a dingir, the determinative designating theonyms (similarly as these of Panakula and Dilimbabbar), in contrast with the Abu Salabikh god list. Gebhard J. Selz suggests that a deified animal might be meant. Westenholz argued that the gender of this deity, who she also assumes might have been a deified animal, is uncertain. However, according to Krebernik and Lisman he was likely male. He is absent from the Fara god list and later sources, and if the reading of the toponym as Kiti and identification with the identically named town near Eshnunna are accepted it is likely that he was later replaced as its tutelary deity by Inanna, as references to Inanna-Kitītum ("Inanna of Kiti") are known.
13	Urum	Dilimbabbar	Dilimbabbar appears as a distinct deity, possibly a northern moon god, in the Zame Hymns, but later on he was fully identified with Nanna; one of the Temple Hymns, which designates him as his shepherd, might represent an intermediate phase of this process. His name is written without the determinative used to designate theonyms in the Zame Hymns.
14	UB	Panakula	It has been suggested that the toponym UB corresponds to Jemdat Nasr. An alternate proposal is that it was an early designation of Opis. The theonym can be translated as "hung with a shining bow", or possibly "carrying a shining bow". It has been suggested that a deified bow might be meant instead of an anthropomorphic deity. Panakula is attested in the Abu Salabikh and Fara god lists as well. Furthermore, the phrase pana ku_{3} la_{2} occurs in the hymn focused on Zabalam, though in this context it likely refers to a part of the city.
15	Sippar	Ninbilulu	The reading of the toponym is uncertain, and instead of Sippar the river Euphrates might be meant. The theonym Ninbilulu occurs in the god lists from Abu Salabikh and Fara as well. It is presumed this deity is related to the irrigation god Enbilulu and to Bilulu from the myth Inanna and Bilulu.
16	Kutha	Nergal	The toponym is spelled logographically as KIŠ.UNUG; phonetic syllabic spellings such as gu_{2}-du_{8}-a were only introduced in the Sargonic period. In addition to the city god of Kutha, Nergal, the hymn also mentions Enki and Ninki, a pair of ancestors of Enlil who were similarly associated with the underworld.
17	Kish	Zababa	The city of Kish is described as a "goring ox", which is presumed to be a metaphorical reference to its reputation in the Early Dynastic period. It has been proposed that it was the center of a large state, but the evidence is not conclusive. Zababa's name is spelled phonetically in the zame hymn, but it is possible that in the Abu Salabikh god list the logogram ^{d}KIŠ^{ki} refers to him. He was considered a major deity in the Early Dynastic period, but later his cult declined, and only experienced a revival in the Old Babylonian period.
18	Adab	Ashgi	The conventional spelling of the toponym Adab in later sources is UD.NUN^{ki}, but in the Zame Hymns, as well as in other Early Dynastic texts from Abu Salabikh, Fara, Isin and Nippur a unique sign similar but not identical to NUN is used to write it.
19	Kesh	Nintur	Nintur, whose name might mean "mistress divine birth hut", is referred to with the epithet ama. She was originally regarded as a distinct deity from Ninhursag, but by the middle of the second millennium BCE both were understood as the same deity.
20	KI.EN.GI (Uruk)	Mes-sanga-Unug	The toponym might refer to Sumer as a whole or to Uruk. Walther Sallaberger suggests the latter is more plausible in this context, and the former meaning is more recent. This interpretation is also accepted by Krebernik and Lisman.
21	None	Men	No toponym is mentioned in the opening line of this hymn; Krebernik and Lisman suggest this might indicate that it continues describing KI.EN.GI. The theonym Men represents a deified crown, but it is uncertain if this deity is identical with Ninmena. It cannot be established with certainty if Men was regarded as male or female.
22	KI.EN.GI (Uruk)	Ninsun	The toponym might refer to Sumer as a whole or to Uruk. Walther Sallaberger suggests the latter is more plausible. Ninsun is referred to with the epithet lamma.
23	KI.EN.GI	Lugalbanda	The restoration of the toponym is uncertain. Lugalbanda was regarded as the husband of Ninsun.
24	IM	Ishkur	The toponym might refer to Karkar, Muru or Enegi. The first reading is the most likely due to the hymn focusing on said city's tutelary god, Ishkur, though the other two options cannot be ruled out fully.
25	Eresh	Nisaba	The location of Eresh remains uncertain; it has been suggested that it was located either between Uruk and Shuruppak, or between Kish and Nippur. Each line of the hymn contains the sign NAGA used to write the theonym Nisaba, which is presumed to be a case of scribal word play. Nisaba's association with the city of Eresh is already attested in the late Uruk period. The epithet nun is used to refer to her. While normally a masculine title, "prince", it is presumed that in cases such as this hymn or the theonym Nungal it should be interpreted as feminine instead.
26	Dulum	Ninduluma	Ninduluma is sparsely attested, but it is known that he functioned as a divine carpenter.
27	Kar nesaĝ	Sirsir	Restoration of the toponym is uncertain. Karadene has also been proposed.
28	AB×ÁŠ	Kiki	Interpreting Kiki (^{d}ki-ki^{mušen}) as a deified bird has been suggested. According to Niek Veldhuis this deity might be identical with Ninkiki from the Fara god list. Krebernik and Lisman propose that Kiki was a goddess associated with water birds, and that her absence from sources postdating the Early Dynastic period might indicate she was identified with Nanshe.
29	AB×ŠÚ	Ezina	No other sources contain any information which would make it possible to identify the city AB×ŠÚ. The worship of Ezina is already documented in the Uruk period. She is one of the first attested goddesses who functioned as tutelary deities of specific cities, next to Nisaba, Nanshe, Inanna of Uruk and Inanna of Zabalam.
30	Ĝišša	Ninura	It has been proposed that in the beginning of the Early Dynastic period, Ĝišša (Umm al-ʿAqārib) was a separate city from Umma (Tell Jokha), but at some point it was abandoned, with its inhabitants presumably moving to nearby Umma, whose name started to be written logographically with the same combination of signs. The meaning of Ninura's name is unknown, and she is only attested in texts from the third millennium BCE. Krebernik and Lisman suggest she was associated with plucking sheep.
31	KI.AN	Shara	The toponym corresponds to later KI.AN^{ki}. This settlement was located in the immediate proximity of Umma. Shara was Ninura's husband.
32	Lagash	Ĝatumdug	Ĝatumdug was associated with Lagash from the beginning of the Early Dynastic period.
33	Niĝin, Sirara	Nanshe	Sirara was the name of Nanshe's temple in Niĝin. She is already associated with the same city in texts from the late Uruk period.
34	Girsu	Ningirsu	Ningirsu was the tutelary god of Girsu and the brother of Nanshe. While he shared many characteristics of Ninurta, and the two were identified in later periods, they most likely originated as two distinct, unrelated deities.
35	Ki'abrig	Ningublaga	The toponym is written with the same signs as the second element in the name of the corresponding deity, but a city named Gublaga is not attested, and likely Ningublaga's cult center Ki'abrig is meant.
36	SAḪAR	^{d}lugal-DÙL.DU	Multiple toponyms written as SAḪAR^{ki} (IŠ^{ki}) are known from other texts from Abu Salabikh, as well as from sources from Ebla and Ur III Girsu, but the reading of none of them can be established. Wilfred G. Lambert suggested that the theonym can be read as Lugal-šurra. Krebernik and Lisman tentatively propose Lugal-surdu, with surdu being a type of falcon, but they also stress that the name was never written with the determinative used to designate bird names, and conclude this weakens their proposal.
37	Enegi	Ninazu	Enegi was located between Ur and Uruk. The hymn mentions dogs (or possibly other animals referred to as ur, such as lions or other large cats), possibly statues standing at the entrance of Ninazu's temple.
38	ŠU.EŠ.GI	Namma	The toponym ŠU.EŠ.GI is also attested in an Early Dynastic city list. However, aside from the Zame Hymns no other sources indicate Namma was viewed as its tutelary deity, or the tutelary deity of any other city, though a temple dedicated to her is mentioned in an inscription of Lugalkisalsi. Overall the evidence for active worship of her is scarce. In Old Babylonian literature she could play the role of a creator deity.
39	AB.KID.KID	^{d}nin-AB.KID.KID	The toponym might correspond to Akkil. Westenholz suggested reading the theonym as Ninakkil and identifying this goddess as Ninshubur, the divine vizier of Inanna. In the hymn, ^{d}nin-AB.KID.KID is described as Inanna's SAL+ḪUB_{2}-gal, The meaning of this title is uncertain, but in the Old Babylonian period it was used to refer to Ninshubur's function in relation to Inanna.
40	GU_{2}.GANA_{2}	Namnir	Restoration of the toponym is uncertain. It might be a shortened form of GANA_{2} gu_{2}-eden-na, Gu'edenna, an area over which the states of Lagash and Umma competed in the Early Dynastic period. The deity Namnir ("sovereign power"), whose gender remains uncertain, is to be distinguished from Enlil's epithet Nunamnir.
41	GANA_{2}.GAL	NUN.GANA_{2}.GAL	Restoration of the toponym is uncertain. NUN.GANA_{2}.GAL is not attested in any other sources, though Krebernik and Lisman suggest she might have been an early form of the well attested goddess Nungal. Westenholz also speculatively proposed a relation between them.
42	Uncertain	Lammašaga	The reading of the toponym is uncertain as the first line of this hymn can be segmented in many different ways. Westenholz tentatively restored it as a reference Uruk. However, according to Krebernik and Lisman this is unlikely.
43	NE.GI	^{d}NE.GI (Gibil/Girra)	The toponym follows the well attested pattern of using the same logograms to represent the names of cities and their tutelary deities, but its reading is unknown. According to Krebernik and Lisman, while signs NUN and KI occur in sequence in the same hymn, it is unlikely that this is a reference to Eridu, as sometimes suggested. Gibil is the conventional modern reading of ^{d}NE.GI, but only the reading Girra is well attested in primary sources.
44	^{d}KU_{7}	^{d}KU_{7}	The toponym and theonym follow the pattern of writing the names of cities and their tutelary deities with the same logogram, but their reading is uncertain. KU_{7} also follows NE.GI in an archaic city list as well, which might reflect a close connection between these two unidentified settlements.
45	URUgunû-gal	^{d}en-(ME.)TE.GAL.TI	Restoration of the theonym is uncertain. It is presumed that this deity is related to ^{d}nin-ME.TE.GAL.TI from the Fara god list.
46	Girim	Ningirima	Girim might have been located in the proximity of Uruk. It might be identical with Murum, the cult center of Ningirima according to the later Temple Hymns. The hymn might compares its tutelary goddess Ningirima to Irḫan, a male snake deity, though it is also possible the river named after him is meant instead. It has been suggested that his name referred to the western branch of the Euphrates, known in Akkadian as Araḫtu.
47	None	Ninekuga	No toponym is mentioned in this hymn; Krebernik and Lisman suggest that this might indicate it continues describing Girim like the preceding one. The attestations of Ninekuga, "mistress of the pure house", are limited to the Early Dynastic period, and little is known about her character and cult.
48	MAR	Nin-MAR.KI	MAR is not otherwise attested as a toponym, unless it fulfills this role in the theonym Nin-MAR.KI. This goddess was the tutelary deity of Gu'abba in the territory of Lagash. The reading of her name, and in particular whether KI should be interpreted as a determinative, remains uncertain. It is possible that KI is a phonetic indicator for an otherwise unknown reading for the sign MAR which survived only in the theonym Nin-MAR.KI.
49	NA.DU_{3}	Nu_{11}-E_{2}.NUN-ta-e_{3}	The toponym can be literally translated as "stele", and the theonym as the "light coming forth from the cella". This deity is otherwise only attested in the Abu Salabikh god list, though multiple structurally similar theonyms are known, for example Urnunta-ea and Meslamtaea. Krebernik and Lisman propose that after the Early Dynastic period Nu_{11}-E_{2}.NUN-ta-e_{3} might have been syncretised with Nuska. The hymn might also mention Ninkar, the sparsely attested goddess of daylight. However, according to Krebernik and Lisman Ningal is the deity meant, and the passage refers to a quay (kar) named after her.
50	E_{2} GAG.KAŠ-si	Ninkasi	It is possible that the toponym is a temple name, e_{2}-gag-kaš-si, "house where the mouth is filled with beer", following the proposed interpretation of Ninkasi's name as a shortened form of nin kag-e kaš si, "lady who fills the mouth with beer". Outside of this hymn she was not associated with a specific cult center of her own, and typically received offerings in temples of major deities.
51	Eš_{3}-kar_{2}-kar_{2}	^{d}MUŠ_{3}.KUR	The toponym can be translated as "shining shrine", but no information about it is available from any other sources; the reading of the theonym is uncertain, though it is likely that the deity meant is Inanna, designated by the epithet KUR. Westenholz pointed out Inanna KUR already appears in sources from the late Uruk period, and suggested translating this variant of the name as "Inanna, the mountain peak". A connection with mountain ranges to the east of Mesopotamia, above which Venus would first appear in the sky from the perspective of the Mesopotamians, is possible, though an alternate interpretation is that KUR refers to the underworld, and Inanna KUR represented the period during which Venus was not visible in the sky. However, Krebernik and Lisman suggest that it is also not impossible that a different deity is meant, and tentatively propose a relation between MUŠ_{3}.KUR and SI.MUŠ_{3}.KUR ("brilliance of the land") from the Fara god list.
52	Kisiga	Ninmug	The toponym Kisiga is not attested in any other texts from the third millennium BCE, and subsequently only appears in a small number of literary texts from the Old Babylonian period and in sources dated to c. 1000-600 BCE. The hymn most likely reflects Ninmug's role as a divine artisan.
53	AB.NAĜAR (eš_{3}-bulug)	Ninnisig	The toponym might mean "the eš_{3} shrine of NAĜAR". The reading of the theonym is uncertain. The gender of this deity, who was regarded as a divine butcher serving Ningirsu or Enlil, is unclear in the Early Dynastic sources, though later evidence indicates she was viewed as a goddess. It has been pointed out that she appears in sequence with Ninmug not only in the Zame Hymns, but also in offering lists from Fara.
54	Shuruppak	Sud	Shuruppak is the ancient name of Fara. Sud is referred to with the epithet nun, "princely". The original character of this goddess is uncertain, but as early as in the Early Dynastic period she started to be closely associated with Enlil, and eventually came to be identified with his wife Ninlil, a tradition reflected in the myth Enlil and Sud, where Sud is the original name of Ninlil.
55	ĜA_{2}×MUŠ	^{d}nin-ĜA_{2}×MUŠ	Krebernik and Lisman note that the ĜA_{2}×MUŠ sign combination, which can be interpreted as a schematic representation of a snake in a box, might be related to clay models of buildings, possibly sanctuaries, with snakes attached to them. The gender of Nin-ĜÁ×MUŠ is unknown, and outside of the Zame Hymns and contemporary god lists neither the theonym not corresponding toponym appear in any sources. It is possible that ^{d}nin-LAGAB×MUŠ from the Fara god list is the same deity. Furthermore, an association with the goddess Ninarali has been suggested.
56	A_{2}-ne/DA-ne	^{d}nin-A_{2}-ne/^{d}nin-DA-ne	The reading of the toponym is uncertain, with evidence for both Ane and Dane available from geographic texts. According to Westenholz, the eponymous tutelary deity of this city might have been a goddess. The theonym ^{d}nin-A_{2}-ne is not attested in any other sources.
57	Isin	Ninisina	Ninisina was regarded as a distinct healing goddess (specifically a divine physician) in the Early Dynastic period, though she declined after the Old Babylonian period and came to be syncretized with Gula.
58	Missing	Missing	The beginning of this hymn cannot be restored yet. According to Krebernik the theonym starts with the signs NIN, but it is not fully preserved in available copies. This deity might have been an eponymous tutelary goddess of a city. It has been suggested that an unplaced fragment in which the toponym is a temple name, E-anki, belongs to this hymn; since it refers to flax, Krebernik and Lisman suggest the associated deity might have been Ninkita (from ki-da, "linen"), later attested as a byname of Ninkilim.
59	Fragmentary	Medimša	Only traces of the toponym survive in available copies; Krebernik and Lisman suggest it might have originally been ^{ĝeš.a}ASAL_{x} (LAK212), literally "Euphrates poplar". The theonym Medimša can be translated as "possessing lovely limbs". Later on this name was used to refer to Ishkur's (Adad's) spouse Shala, an originally separate deity who most likely originated in Upper Mesopotamia, possibly in a Hurrian milieu. Daniel Schwemer notes that there is no evidence for Medimša herself being the spouse of a weather god before the Old Babylonian period, though it is possible that this is only the result of chance preservation. It is possible that a naked rain goddess depicted next to the weather god on cylinder seals can be identified as Medimša.
60	LAK225	Lugalusaḫar	The restoration of the toponym is uncertain. The deity Lugalusaḫar, whose name has been compared to Usaḫara, a goddess associated with Shara, appears in sequence with Medimša in the Abu Salabikh god list as well, though their order is reversed compared to the zame hymns.
61	Kisig	Nunuzdug	The toponym is sometimes interpreted as Kisiga, but according to Krebernik and Lisman despite having a similar reading it should be distinguished from the city mentioned in hymn 52. The theonym occurs only in sources from the Early Dynastic period. The element ^{nu}NUNUZ in the theonym Nunuzdug (^{d nu}NUNUZ-du_{10}) might be an early form of the Emesal version of munus, "woman". The translation "good woman" has accordingly been proposed. The possibility that nu-NUNUZ was a gender neutral designation of a profession is less likely.
62	Uncertain	Lugaldasila	The toponym might be Kisig, though this remains uncertain. Selz suggests reading the theonym as Lugalkudda, and proposes that this deity might be related to Saĝkud. However, according to Krebernik and Lisman this reading is unlikely, and it is more likely that the theonym should be interpreted as Lugaldasila, "lord of the street side", possibly to be connected with Lugalsila from the Fara god list.
63	Dugina	^{d}MI.DAM	The deity ^{d}MI.DAM does not occur in any other sources, but identification with ^{d}nin-MI.DAM known from the Fara god list and from a single theophoric name from Early Dynastic Girsu has been proposed. Westenholz suggested reading this name as Dammi and interpreted the deity as female.
64	Umma	Enlunugid	Douglas Frayne interpreted the theonym as en ^{(d)}Bu-lu_{2}-lu_{x}, and assumed that this deity was female. Westenholz voiced support for this proposal as well, and speculated that ^{(d)}Bu-lu_{2}-lu_{x} was a goddess from the pantheon of Umma worshiped only through the Early Dynastic period. However, according to Krebernik and Lisman the correct reading is most likely Enlunugid ("lord who lets nobody return)"; they suggest that this deity was an early form of Ennugi.
65	GIN_{2}.U_{9}.ŠA_{3}.GA	Ninšuburmaḫ	Ninšuburmaḫ (^{d}nin-šubur-AL) occurs between two forms of Ninshubur in the Fara god list, but the identity of this deity is uncertain. Identification as another form of Ninshubur has been suggested.
66	A.ŠA_{3}.BU	Amaramana	The theonym is not attested in any other sources.
67	KI.AN	(An)tuda	Identification of the toponym with later KI.AN^{ki} has been suggested. The logogram ^{d}TU(-da) which occurs in this hymn could refer to two different deities, Nintur, and Tuda (or Antuda), who was regarded a divine incantation priest and might have been the forerunner of Tutu; it is assumed the latter is meant in this case.
68	Muru	Ama'ušumgal	The toponym is written as IM, but Muru is considered a more plausible reading than Enegi or Karkar in this case. The theonym is the early name of the god later known as Dumuzi; however, up to the end of the Sargonic period the name Dumuzi most likely exclusively referred to a different deity, the goddess Dumuzi-abzu, instead.
69	Kullaba	Ninniĝara	The theonym is written as ^{d}nin-naĝar or ^{d}nin-SIG.E_{2} depending on the copy, but it is presumed that the deity meant is Ninniĝara. An apparent connection between her and the pantheon of Uruk is also attested in the Fara god list. She was most likely a healing goddess. The element niĝar in her name likely refers to a fetus. It is also attested as the designation of a part of temples of a number of deities. In addition to Ninniĝara, the hymn also mentions Utu, Ištaran and Nin-UM, which might reflect the presence of images representing them in a temple dedicated to her.
70	ĜEŠ.GI	Lisin	The toponym might be the ancient name of Abu Salabikh. Lisin is addressed with the epithet ama, "mother", but it likely serves as a way to designate her as the tutelary deity of the city, and does not necessarily indicate she had maternal characteristics. The formula used in the hymn dedicated to her is unique, and can be translated as "the great gods and mother Lisin - praise".

== Possible influence on later texts ==
In contrast with compositions such as the Instructions of Shuruppak or the Kesh temple hymn, the Zame Hymns did not continue to be copied in later periods. The Temple Hymns attributed to Enheduanna are the only known collection of hymns written in Sumerian with a similar structure. While a number of texts from Fara, including a composition focused on Sud and her temple, as well as a section of the Kesh temple hymn describing the eponymous house of worship (lines 22–54) show parallels to them too, ultimately the Temple Hymns are the most similar. Comparisons between them have been made as early as 1966. The Zame Hymns are sometimes outright described as a forerunner of the Temple Hymns, and it has been suggested the author of the latter work was familiar with the former. Both compositions deal with the assignment of cult centers to major deities, and around a half of the cities mentioned in the Temple Hymns are also present in the Zame Hymns. However, the Temple Hymns do not use the formula zame; its later form zami only appears in the hymn dedicated to Nisaba and her cult center Eresh.
