= Nindara =

Mesopotamian god

- Major cult center: Lagash, Girsu, Ki'esa

Genealogy
- Siblings: possibly Hendursaga
- Spouse: Nanshe
- Children: Nin-MAR.KI

Nindara (𒀭𒊩𒌆𒁯𒀀, Nindar in sources predating the reign of Gudea) was a Mesopotamian god worshiped in the state of Lagash. He was the husband of Nanshe, and it is assumed that his relevance in Mesopotamian religion depended on this connection. His character remains opaque due to his small role in known texts.

== Character ==
Nindara's character is not well defined in known sources, and his importance in Mesopotamian religion has been characterized as modest. He was regarded as the husband of Nanshe, and it is presumed that he was actively worshiped in the state of Lagash largely because of this association. Due to fulfilling this role, he belonged to the circle of the deities associated with her, which in addition to him included the goddess Nin-MAR.KI, regarded as her daughter, and the servant god Hendursaga. Gebhard J. Selz proposes that he was regarded as the older brother of the last of these deities. It is possible that all three of the deities forming Nanshe's circle had chapels in her main temple, or perhaps own temples in her holy city. The proposal that Nindara was identical with Nindub, yet another god attested in offering lists dedicated to Nanshe and deities related to her, is considered unfounded.

Possibly due to being worshiped in a harbor city, Nindara was sometimes called "the lord of the holy sea", while in a balbale hymn of Nanshe he is described as "the tax collector of the sea." However, his most common epithet, attested as early as the reign of the Early Dynastic king Enannatum I, was Lugal-uru_{16}, "the powerful master." Selz points out that this epithet appears to simply be a masculine counterpart of a well attested title of Nanshe. It might point at a warlike character. Gudea in a royal inscription credits Nindara with giving him strength. Like Nanshe, he was also associated with birds, specifically the dar bird (dar^{mušen}), possibly a francolin.

== Worship ==
Ki'esa was Nindara's main cult center, and his temple in that city was the Elaltum (Sumerian: "house producing date syrup"). He was also regarded as the tutelary god of his wife's cult city, Niĝun, identified with modern Tell Zurghul. Further locations where he was worshiped include the cities of Girsu and Lagash. In offering lists pertaining to the cult of Nanshe, Nindara appears after her, Enki (of Giguna), Ningirsu and in one case Hendursaga, though elsewhere the last god occurs after him, alongside Dumuzi-abzu.

A text from Lagash from the Ur III period mentions that during a New Year festival he received offerings which possibly were meant to function as betrothal gifts for him and Nanshe. A tablet from the same period from Drehem mentions that a single fat-tailed sheep was offered to him in Kesh. A festival involving boats dedicated to Nindara, Nanshe and other deities is also attested.

Theophoric names invoking Nindara are known from texts from Lagash, with the variants Ur-Nindar and Ur-Nindara both being attested.

=== Outside Mesopotamia ===
Wouter Henkelman proposes that the logographic writing NIN.DAR.A might be read as Simut (an Elamite god associated with Nergal ) in some Elamite inscriptions, where this deity appears alongside the rainbow goddess Manzat. However, Daniel T. Potts identifies the Elamite NIN.DAR.A as a goddess.
