= Dumuzi-abzu =

Mesopotamian goddess

- Tutelary goddess of Kinunir
- Major cult center: Kinunir

Dumuzi-abzu (Sumerian: 𒀭𒌉𒍣𒍪𒀊, lit. 'good child of the Abzu'), sometimes spelled Dumuziabzu, was a Mesopotamian goddess worshiped in the state of Lagash. She was the tutelary deity of Kinunir.

In modern scholarship it is assumed that in most contexts Dumuzi-abzu should not be confused with Dumuzi, the husband of Inanna, even though her name could be shortened to Dumuzi. It is nonetheless possible that after she ceased to be worshiped, the name Dumuzi-abzu was misunderstood as belonging to him.

== Character ==
Dumuzi-abzu was the tutelary goddess of Kinunir, a city located near Lagash. It was also known under the name Kinirša. It is not universally agreed that Kinnir was yet another form of the same name, but Manfred Krebernik nonetheless argues that its city goddess, Nin-Kinnir, "lady of Kinnir," was a name of Dumuzi-abzu. A reference to her role as a city goddess is known from Lamentation over the Destruction of Ur, according to which during a tumultuous period "Dumuziabzu has abandoned the house in Kinirša."

It is assumed that she belonged to the circle of deities associated with Nanshe, and that she might have been especially closely connected with her daughter Nin-MAR.KI. Dumuzi-abzu is present in various offering lists connected to the cult of Nanshe. She occurs in them in the proximity of deities such as Hendursaga, Nindara and Ninshubur. It is also possible that she was regarded as the wife of Hendursaga in the third millennium BCE, though family relations between deities were not yet systematized at the time. In later periods, Hendursaga was instead associated with Ninmug, who was originally the wife of Ishum.

Texts from Lagash indicate that Dumuzi-Abzu was among the deities believed to be responsible for making a ruler virtuous, with the other members of this group being Enki, Gatumdug, Hendursaga, Inanna, Lugalurub, Nanshe, Nindara and Ningirsu. However, based on varying amount of offerings they received it is assumed that these gods were not regarded as equal in rank.

While Thorkild Jacobsen based on location of her cult center placed her among the deities associated with "the power of water, reeds, birds and fish" alongside Enki, Asalluhi, Nanshe and Nin-MAR.KI, the view that Mesopotamian gods can be grouped based on "the ecological potential of their respective habitats" has been criticized by Wilfred G. Lambert, who characterized it as creating "more system than really existed." Frans Wiggermann notes that in some cases such associations, when actually attested, like the connection between the moon god Nanna and cow herding, might at best represent secondary developments.

== Dumuzi-abzu and Dumuzi ==
While due to her name Dumuzi-abzu was characterized as a Dumuzi-like figure in older scholarship, this view is no longer regarded as correct. Andrew R. George acknowledges that this holds true for Dumuzi-abzu as a distinct, female deity, but argues that in the second and first millennia BCE, the name might have functioned as an epithet of the male Dumuzi, designating him in his role of a god of the underworld. Confusion between Dumuzi-abzu and Dumuzi does appear to be present in a few literary texts. For example, in one love song Inanna addresses her lover as Dumuzi-abzu, rather than Dumuzi. In the god list An = Anum the name Dumuzi-abzu refers to a minor male deity, a son of Enki, even though in a text considered to be its Old Babylonian forerunner Dumuzi-abzu is female (and also glossed as a name of Zarpanit). Akiko Tsujita proposes that the male Dumuzi-abzu developed due to confusion between Dumuzi-abzu and Dumuzi, which resulted in assumptions that she was a male deity, who was subsequently assigned to the court of Enki based on presence of Abzu in the name.

It is a matter of debate whether the theonym Dumuzi present in pre-Sargonic administrative documents and theophoric names should be interpreted as Dumuzi-abzu or as the husband of Inanna. The latter is absent from god lists predating the Old Babylonian period, but it is sometimes proposed that he might already be present in names from the Ur III or even Fara period. For instance, it is also uncertain if the deity invoked in a number of theophoric names from Lagash, such as Geme-Dumuzi or Ur-Dumuzi, should be understood as Dumuzi-abzu or Dumuzi. It is known that in Kinunir, Dumuzi-abzu's name could be shortened to Dumuzi. Manfred Krebernik argues that in the oldest sources, such as these from Early Dynastic Fara, only the name Amaušumgal should be understood as referring to the male Dumuzi. He proposes that the latter name first started to be used to refer to him in Uruk and Umma in the Sargonic period, while in earlier sources it referred to Dumuzi-abzu.

In addition to Dumuzi-abzu, a second deity with a similar name was also worshiped in Lagash, Dumuzi-gu'ena ("good child of the throne room"), but there is no indication that there was any relation between them. It is possible that Dumuzi-gu'ena was also a goddess, rather than a god.

== Worship ==
Dumuzi-abzu was among the deities worshiped in the state of Lagash. A temple dedicated to her existed in Kinunir. It is possible that it also housed shrines of Nergal and Ningishzida. At one point it was pillaged by Lugalzagesi. Kinunir often occurs in documents from the Ur III period alongside Nina, the cult center of Nanshe. It was associated with the textile industry. Ur-Baba built a temple of Dumuzi-abzu, referred to as "lady of Kinunir" in related inscriptions, in Girsu. A temple dedicated to her also existed in Nina. However, no specific names of any her temples are presently unknown. Some toponyms from the Lagash area also appear to refer to her, for example Du-Dumuzi, "hill of Dumuzi(-Abzu)." Sanga priests of Dumuzi-abzu are well attested in sources from the state of Lagash. Her clergy is also present in sources from the Ur III period.

Eannatum of Lagash called himself "beloved of Dumuzi-abzu." However, she is absent from the official titles of other rulers of this city-state. She is mentioned in a curse formula of Gudea of Lagash, inscribed on one of his statues. She is the second to last deity mentioned, appearing after Nin-MAR.KI and before the king's personal god Ningishzida. Other deities invoked in it are Anu, Enlil, Ninhursag, Enki, Sin, Ningirsu, Nanshe, Nindara, Gatumdug, Bau, Inanna, Utu, Hendursaga, Igalim and Shulshaga.

One of the hymns from a collection most likely composed under the rule of the Sargonic dynasty is dedicated to Dumuzi-abzu.

Dumuzi-abzu largely ceased to be worshiped after the Ur III period due to the decline of Lagash as a political and religious center.
