= Nanshe =

Mesopotamian goddess

- Goddess of marshlands, the sea, birds, fish, social welfare and dream interpretation
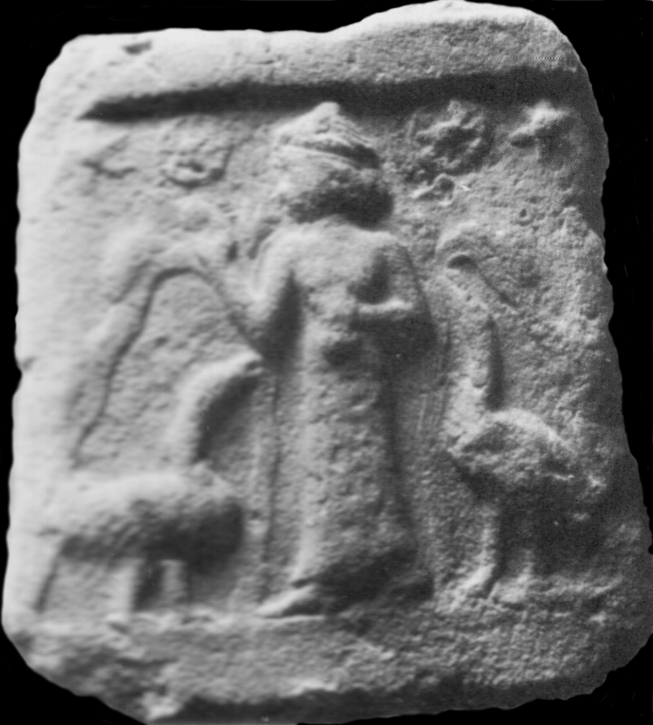
- Standing goddess, probably Nanshe. She is accompanied by two birds, possibly geese, and holds a vase in hand. Two streams of water and fish emerge from the vessel. Two six-pointed stars and two solar discs are behind the goddess. Ur III period.
- Major cult center: Tell Zurghul (Nina, Sirara)
- Animals: u_{5} bird, fish
- Region: Territory of Lagash

Genealogy
- Parents: Enki and Damgalnuna
- Siblings: Ningirsu
- Spouse: Nindara
- Children: Nin-MAR.KI

Nanshe (Sumerian: 𒀭𒀏 ^{d}NANŠE (AB×ḪA)) was a Mesopotamian goddess in various contexts associated with the sea, marshlands, the animals inhabiting these biomes, namely bird and fish, as well as divination, dream interpretation, justice, social welfare, and certain administrative tasks. She was regarded as a daughter of Enki and sister of Ningirsu, while her husband was Nindara, who is otherwise little known. Other deities who belonged to her circle included her daughter Nin-MAR.KI, as well as Hendursaga, Dumuzi-abzu and Shul-utula. In Ur she was incorporated into the circle of Ningal, while in incantations she appears alongside Ningirima or Nammu.

The oldest attestations of the worship of Nanshe come from the Uruk period. Her cult center was Tell Zurghul, known in antiquity as Nina. Another place associated with her, Sirara, was likely a sacred district in this city. She was also worshiped elsewhere in the state of Lagash. Sanctuaries dedicated to her existed in its eponymous capital, as well as in Girsu, Gu'abba and other settlements. She is also attested in a number of other cities in other parts of Mesopotamia, including Adab, Nippur, Umma, Ur and Uruk, but her importance in their local pantheons was comparatively smaller. Her cult declined after the Ur III period. She was later adopted as a dynastic tutelary deity by the kings of the Sealand, and also came to be worshiped in the Esagil temple complex in Babylon. She was still venerated in the sixth century BCE.

Multiple literary texts focused on Nanshe are known. Nanshe and the Birds focuses on her relation with her symbolic animal, the u_{5} bird. Its species is a matter of dispute, with proposed identifications including goose, swan, cormorant, gull and pelican. In the myth Enki and Ninhursag, she appears as one of the deities created by Ninhursag to cure Enki's illness. Other compositions deal with her relation to the sea, fish or dream interpretation.

== Name ==
The meaning of Nanshe's name is unknown, and it is agreed it has no plausible Sumerian etymology. It was written in cuneiform with the signs ^{d}AB×ḪA, with the dingir sign being a determinative designating names of the deities, while AB×ḪA is a combination of the signs "shrine" and "fish", with the latter written inside the former. A common phonetic variant, ^{d}na-zi, first appears in texts from Ebla, for example in the theophoric names of two Mariote singers, ur-na-zi and ur-na-zi-a, and by the Old Babylonian period came to be used equally commonly in lexical lists. In texts from the Sealand, it is the typical spelling. It is also present in An = Anum and in the myth Enki and Ninhursag. It has been proposed that it reflects a speculative variant form of the name, Nassi. It has also been interpreted as a possible emesal spelling. In the Nippur god list, the traditional spelling and ^{d}na-zi are juxtaposed as two orthographies of a single theonym. Further syllabic spellings are also known, for example ^{d}na-áš, na-an-še and na-aš-še. The last of them occurs in the Old Babylonian lexical list "Diri Nippur."

It is possible that ^{d}šar-ra-at-ni-na, "queen of Nina", was an alternate name of Nanshe. However, this name is only attested in a list of deities from the Sealand, and an alternative proposal is that it refers to Ishtar of Nineveh, though it is not universally accepted either.

Andrew R. George notes that in the Canonical Temple List Sirara, a toponym associated with Nanshe, might have been reinterpreted as an alternate name of her.

== Character and iconography ==
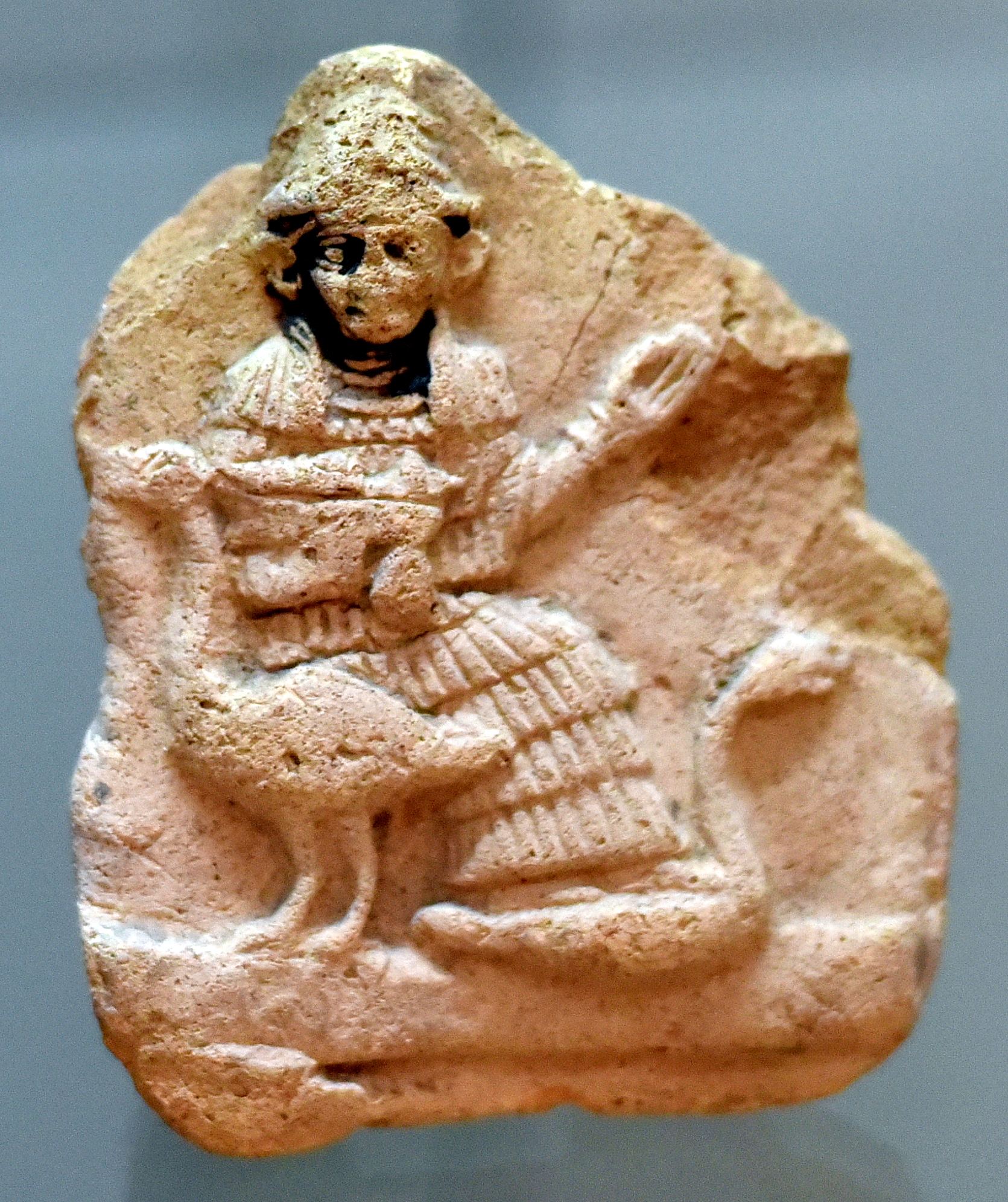
Terracotta plaque showing seated goddess Nanshe and geese. from southern Iraq. 2003-1595 BCE. Iraq Museum

Nanshe's functions have been described as "heterogeneous", and a variety of roles and presumed iconographic attributes are attested for her in primary sources.

=== Water, fish and birds ===
Nanshe was associated with water. Wolfgang Heimpel argues she was believed to reside in the open sea, and points out individual texts allude to her playing with the waves and sea foam, or being born on the waterfront. However, the term ab, "sea", was also used to refer to marshlands in Sumerian and Nanshe has been described as the goddess of this biome. She was associated with the animals inhabiting it, namely fish and birds. The text Nanshe and the Birds calls her "the one who loves fish and fowl". These two groups of animals were commonly associated with each other in Sumerian literary texts. In the literary composition inscribed on the Gudea cylinders Nanshe's emblem is an u_{5}-ku, agreed to be a type of bird, though there is no single agreed upon translation; proposals include "white swan", "sacred seagull", "holy goose" and "pure cormorant". In the past it was sometimes assumed this term referred to a part of a ship, perhaps prow or cabin, but this view is no longer accepted today. Various works of art depicting Nanshe in the company of birds presumed to be geese or swans are known. It is also possible images of a goddess sitting on a large bird known from seals from Lagash (and in one case Ur) can be identified as representations of her. In at least one text, a fish appears to be referred to as an emblem of Nanshe as well. In two hymns, she appears in company of various fish, presumed to be marine or anadromous: the "scepter fish", which she holds like the object it was named after; the "sandal fish"; the "fire fish". which provides light for her in the depths; the bellowing "bull fish"; and the "swallow fish". However, Bendt Alster noted there is no agreement among researchers if all of these names referred to real animals. The myth Enki and the World Order states that she was responsible for providing Enlil with fish as well.

=== Dream interpretation ===
Nanshe was also associated with dream interpretation, prophecies and divination. Gudea referred to her as the "dream interpreter of the gods". Niek Veldhuis argues that this role might be only valid for Nanshe understood as the divine mother of the kings of Lagash, as she does not appear as a dream interpreter in other contexts, and female relatives of the protagonist were often responsible for it in Mesopotamian literary works, as attested in the Epic of Gilgamesh, where Ninsun interprets the dreams of her son, or in narratives focused on Dumuzi, where it is the task of his sister Geshtinanna. Gebhard J. Selz presumes that Nanshe's attested association with wisdom also pertains to divinatory arts. It has also been pointed out that the fact that geese were associated with both wisdom and premonition might have influenced her presumed connection to them.

=== Administration and social welfare ===
Certain administrative tasks, such as weighing and measuring, were also believed to be among Nanshe's responsibilities. She was said to demarcate boundaries, and this role is still attested for her in the Gula Hymn of Bulluṭsa-rabi, where she is called bēlet kudurri, "lady of the boundary stone". She was considered a deity of justice and social welfare. She functioned as the divine protector and benefactor of various disadvantaged groups, such as orphans, widows or people belonging to indebted households. Wolfgang Heimpel notes that the emphasis on this aspect of her character in one of the hymns dedicated to her indicates that it was a fundamental element of her character, rather than just an extension of the typical roles of any tutelary deity of a Mesopotamian city, and points out that a single administrative text lists grain rations for a widow alongside these meant for Nanshe's clergy.

=== Lamma ===
Texts from Lagash might indicate that Nanshe could fulfill the role of a so-called Lamma. This term can be translated as "protective goddess". According to Gina Konstantopoulos, the responsibility of any deity considered to be a Lamma was to "maintain a protected space around an individual, creating a space wherein no harm, be it of demonic origin or otherwise, can threaten whomever they are protecting." Julia M. Asher-Greve notes they could also protect specific locations, for examples temples or private buildings, rather than individuals.

== Associations with other deities ==
=== Family and court ===
Like other deities considered to be major members of the Mesopotamian pantheon, Nanshe was believed to have various relatives, as well as a divine court. Enki was regarded as her father, while her mother was his wife Damgalnuna. The text inscribed on the Gudea cylinders calls her the "daughter of Eridu". The myth Enki and the World Order refers to Enlil as her father, but this tradition is only known from this source, and the text still presents Enki as responsible for determining her destiny. Nanshe's brother was Ningirsu, who likely initially was also viewed as Enki's child. The connection between them was meant to reflect Nanshe's importance in the local pantheon. They are attested together in various texts from Lagash, for example Entemena mentions border dikes dedicated to them both, while Gudea credits them with facilitating the arrival of goods from distant lands.

Nanshe's spouse was the god Nindara. An annual festival celebrated their marriage. Nindara's character is poorly known, and it is presumed that he was primarily worshiped due to his association with Nanshe. Their daughter was the goddess Nin-MAR.KI. Walther Sallaberger notes she had much in common with her mother, for example the location of their respective cult centers (Gu'abba and Nina), the use of birds as symbols of them both in art, and the connection to the sea. He also suggests that the deity ^{d}Nin-MÙŠ-bad, who was worshiped alongside Nin-MAR.KI, might have been initially seen as her brother and Nanshe's son. A further deity closely associated with Nanshe was Hendursaga. He was believed to act as her herald and overseer of her estate. Dumuzi-abzu, who often appears in association with Nin-MAR.KI, as well as Shul-utula, the family god of Ur-Nanshe's dynasty, were further more deities who belonged to Nanshe's circle. Additional members of the pantheon mentioned in association with her in hymns include Nisaba, Haya, Ningublaga, Ningishzida and Ištaran, though in the case of the last two the context in which they appear is unclear.

None of the deities associated with Nanshe in Lagash appear in the texts from the Sealand, with the exception of Ningirsu, who is only present in a single offering list. Their absence might indicate that the earlier tradition of this state had no bearing on the new dynasty who came to worship Nanshe, or that the latter only controlled a small part of the former Lagashite territory. While the god list An = Anum equates Nanshe's spouse Nindara with Sin, she does not appear in relation with the moon god in this corpus, which according to Odette Boivin indicates this tradition was not related to her role in the local pantheon of the Sealand.

=== Other associations ===
In Ur in the Old Babylonian period, Nanshe came to be integrated into the circle of deities associated with Ningal, the wife of the moon god.

In the Gula Hymn of Bulluṭsa-rabi, Nanshe is among the deities equated with the eponymous goddess. Her presence in this text is considered unusual, though information about her usual character is preserved.

In incantations, Nanshe could be linked with Ningirima. Invoking them together might have been a result of their shared association with water. Another deity she could be paired with was Nammu. According to Wolfgang Heimpel, they appear together commonly in sources postdating the Ur III period. An incantation conventionally referred to as Gattung II groups Nanshe with both Nammu and Ningirima and, if the restoration of the text is correct, refers to her as the "prime daughter of Enki" (dumu-munus sag ^{d}en-ki-ga-ke_{4}) while a similar text, Gattung III, places her in the court of this god, between Nammu and Ara, a well attested servant deity. A late expository text equates Nammu and Nanshe with Apsu and another figure whose name is not preserved, possibly Tiamat. Wilfred G. Lambert concluded this singular source might be an example of the influence of Enūma Eliš on other theological works, and as such does not necessarily represent an independent tradition. He also notes Nammu was apparently understood as a male deity and perhaps Nanshe's husband by the compiler, despite usually being female.

=== Uncertain associations ===
Manfred Krebernik and Jan Lisman suggest that the goddess Kiki (also known as Ninkiki), who occurs in the Zame Hymns as the tutelary deity of the unidentified location AB×AŠ_{2} (hymn 28) and in the contemporary god lists from Fara and Abu Salabikh was at some point syncretised with Nanshe, as she shared her association with water birds and appears only in Early Dynastic sources.

It has been proposed that a goddess known as Ninšagepada ("the appointed mistress") or Šagepada ("the appointed"), who was worshiped in Ur in the temple of Gula and appears in inscriptions of Ur-Nammu, was a Nanshe-like figure ("Nanshe-Gestalt") due to the similarity of her name and that of the temple Ešapada in Lagash, dedicated to the latter. A deity bearing the name Šagepada was also worshiped in Uruk in the Seleucid period, and might be the same goddess. Her character is poorly known.

== Worship ==
=== Early attestations ===
Nanshe is first attested in sources from the late Uruk period. She is one of the oldest known tutelary goddesses of specific Mesopotamian cities, next to the likes of Nisaba, Ezina, Inanna of Uruk (under various epithets) and Inanna of Zabalam. Her cult center was a city represented by the signs AB×ḪA^{ki}, which could also be used to write her own name if a different determinative, dingir, was used instead. According to Joan Goodnick Westenholz, the logographic writing of the city's was patterned after the theonym. The name Nina or NINA is employed to refer to it in Assyriological literature. Other proposed readings include Niĝin, Nenua, Ninâ Nimin and Niĝen. It was located in the southeastern part of what eventually came to be the state of Lagash, eight kilometers to the southeast of its eponymous capital, and has been identified with modern Tell Zurghul in Iraq. In the past, the site was located on the coast of the Persian Gulf. According to Dietz Otto Edzard, Sirara, another toponym associated with Nanshe, might have been a sacred precinct of Nina or the name of a temple located in it, though they might have also been two separate nearby settlements, which perhaps at some point fused into a single urban area, similarly to Uruk and Kullaba. Andrew R. George also accepts that Sirara was a location within Nina. It is first mentioned in texts from the reign of Entemena. It is mentioned alongside Nina as a cult center of Nanshe in the thirty third of the Zame Hymns from Early Dynastic Abu Salabikh. It continued to appear in building inscriptions until the time of Gudea, but in the Ur III period it is only mentioned sporadically in theophoric names and names of fields, and later on its occurrences are limited to literary and lexical texts. A temple named Esirara, originally built by Ur-Nanshe, was located in it.

Gebhard J. Selz states that it is possible that Ur-Nanshe, who was the founder of the first dynasty of Lagash, the first attested local user of the title lugal, and a devotee of Nanshe, came from a family which originally lived in the proximity of Nina.

=== Lagash ===
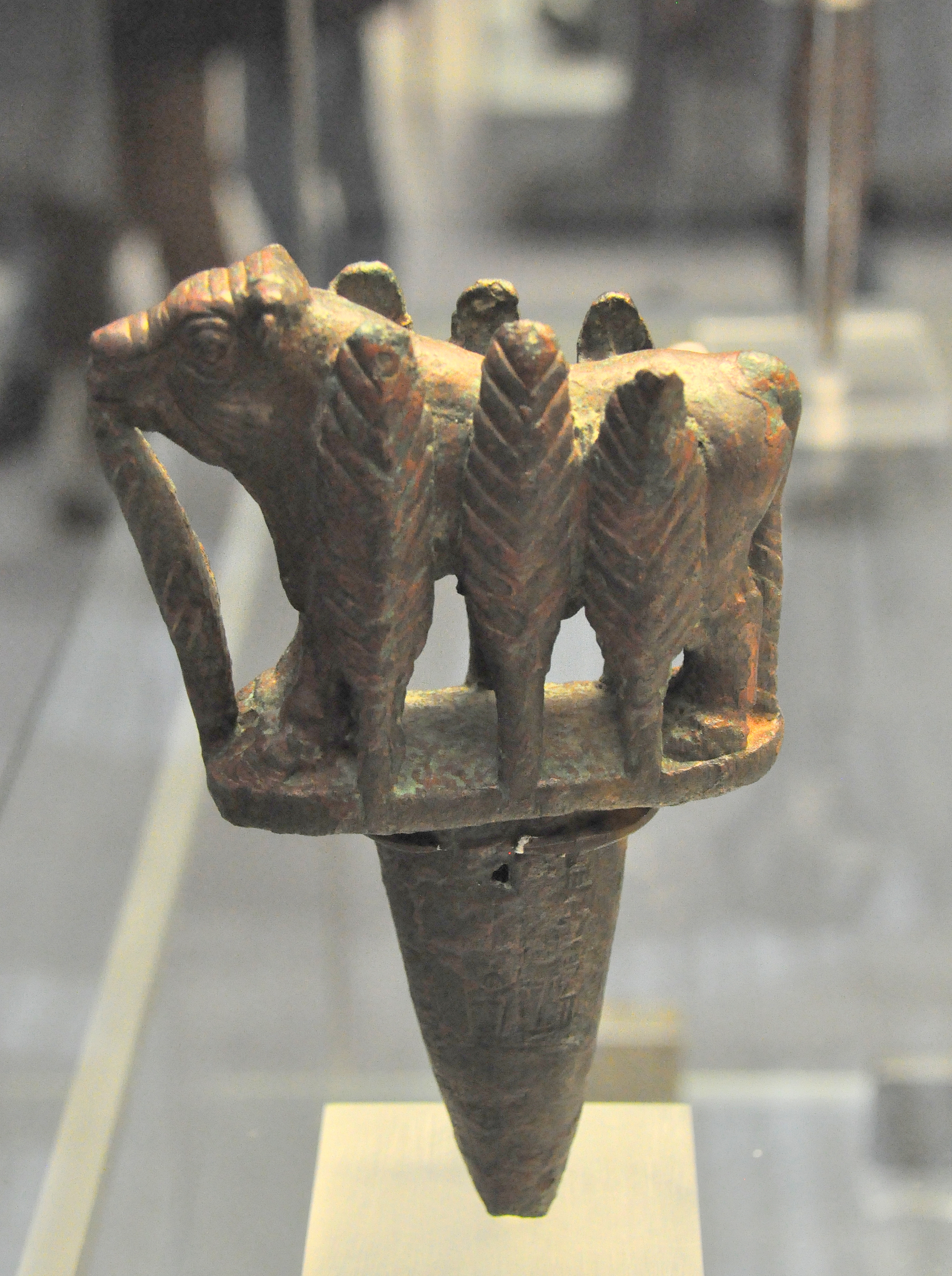
Foundation peg from the temple of goddess Nanshe at Sirara, rebuilt by Gudea. Bull calf in reed marsh. Circa 2130 BCE. Probably from Sirara, Iraq. The British Museum, London

Nanshe was a central figure in the pantheon of the state of Lagash. According to Wolfgang Heimpel, she was the second main deity locally, with Ningirsu, her and the "great gods of Lagash" constituting what he deems the "essential pantheon," though he notes a longer sequence places them respectively in the sixth and seventh spot rather than first and second, after Anu, Enlil, Ninhursag, Enki and Suen. It has also been argued that during the reign of Gudea, Bau was hierarchically elevated above her. Nanshe played a role in the royal ideology during the reign of Ur-Nanshe and might have been connected to the religious legitimization of his dynasty, as evidenced by the fact that Entemena credited her with granting him rule over his kingdom.

Entemena built a temple dedicated to Nanshe which bore the ceremonial name Ešapada, "house chosen in the heart". It was one of the three primary houses of worship in the city of Lagash, next to the temples of Inanna and Ningirsu. A shrine dedicated to her, Eagasulim, possibly "house, hall of radiance", is also known, and was located either in Lagash or in Girsu. In the latter city she was also worshiped in the Šešgarra (or Ešešegarra, "house established by the brother"), which was built by Ur-Nanshe. She also had a shrine in the Eninnu, in which she was worshiped alongside Shul-utula. It bore the ceremonial name Emaḫ, which can be translated as "exalted house", and is also attested as the designation of various other houses of worship in Mesopotamia, for example the temple of Ninhursag in Adab. The location of a further shrine of Nanshe, Eĝidru, "house of the scepter", is uncertain: it might have been a part of the Eninnu complex in Girsu, though it also has been proposed that it was located in Lagash or Nina. In Gu'abba she was worshiped in the Igigal, literally "wisdom", implicitly "(house of) wisdom". She also had sanctuaries in Kisala, which was either located close to Girsu, or outright was a part of it, and in Sulum, whose location is unknown. Various festivals were held in Nanshe's honor. Some of the sacrifices made during them took place on the banks of canals.

Multiple of Gudea's inscriptions commemorate the rebuilding of Nanshe's temple in Sirara. Furthermore, three clay cones from his reign mention the construction of a temple dedicated to her, the E-angur ("house of deep waters"), in Sulum. The twelfth of his year names refers to the fashioning of a new throne for Nanshe. In the text inscribed on his cylinders he designated her as his divine mother, though Ninsun appears in this role in relation to him too. A hymn to Nanshe describes Gudea as her protegee.

Nanshe's clergy included a head priest referred to as en or enmezianna. While the office might have already existed in the Early Dynastic period, the first certain attestations come from the Ur III period. Another title associated with the worship of Nanshe was abgal, "wise person", which is not attested in connection with the cult of any other deities. It has been proposed that the abgal also functioned as the en in early times, but this is uncertain. Other members of the temple personnel included gala clergy, harpists and mourners. Various workmen are also attested in association with them, for example smiths and herdsmen.

Theophoric names invoking Nanshe were common in the state of Lagash. In addition to Ur-Nanshe, "servant of Nanshe," some of the other examples include names such as Geme-Nanshe ("maid of Nanshe"), Lu-Nanshe ("man of Nanshe") or Nanshe-urmu ("Nanshe is my heroine").

The worship of Nanshe continued in Nina, Lagash, Girsu and a number of other nearby settlements through the Ur III period. An en priest dedicated to her first attested in documents from the reign of Shulgi and still active after assumption of the throne by Ibbi-Sin, Ur-Ningirsu (not to be confused with the ensi Ur-Ningirsu II, possibly also a contemporary of Shulgi) might have ruled over Lagash as an independent polity in the final years of the Ur state.

=== Other cities ===
It has been argued that in other local pantheons Nanshe never reached a comparable prominence as in Lagash. Julia M. Asher-Greve argues that it is not impossible Nanshe was introduced to the pantheon of Nippur as early as in the Early Dynastic period. An offering list from Girsu mentions "Nanshe of Nippur" as the recipient of fruit. A contemporary votive relief dedicated to her is also known from the latter city. Nanshe was also known in Adab, but the evidence is limited to an Early Dynastic literary text, a single offering list and a handful of theophoric names, such as Lu-Nanshe, Me-Nanshe and Ur-Nanshe, all from the Sargonic period. In Umma, during the reign of the Third Dynasty of Ur the local manifestation of the goddess, "Nanshe of Umma", received regular offerings, as attested in administrative texts. She was venerated in Uruk and Ur in the same period too, but only in a limited capacity.

In the beginning of the second millennium BCE, the influence of the area of Lagash declined, which also resulted in the loss of importance of local deities, including Nanshe. An analogous phenomenon is attested for many other southern Mesopotamian deities, such as Shara, the tutelary god of Umma. Evidence for the worship of Nanshe in the Old Babylonian period is rare, for example she only sporadically appears in personal letters. It is known that the city of Nina still existed, though references to it are not frequent and nothing is known about its religious life. Nanshe continued to be worshiped in Ur, and appears in a handful of religious texts from Nippur as well. In the former of these two cities, she received offerings alongside Ningal in the Isin-Larsa period. It is also possible that while sparsely attested in official documents, she was a popular object of personal devotion there.

=== Sealand ===
At some point Nanshe became the tutelary goddess of the First Sealand dynasty. At this time, she was not associated with any cities outside of the former territory of Lagash. According to Joan Goodnick Westenholz, interpreting the situation both as a "continuation" and as a "revival" of her cult is possible. Odette Boivin argues that it was an "import" in the Sealand court, which according to her might be why Nanshe's traditional retinue and other Lagashite deities do not have a meaningful presence in the Sealand texts. It is possible the Sealand state controlled her old cult center Nina, but most likely the former Lagashite territories were neither the core area of the kingdom nor the point of origin of its ruling house. Nanshe's cult was nonetheless sponsored by the kings themselves, and she presumably belonged to the state pantheon. She received offerings referred to as nindabû, which might have been a commemoration of the full moon. She also regularly received animal sacrifices, chiefly ewes, considered to be particularly valuable. While Nanshe is one of the best attested deities in the corpus of Sealand texts next to Ishtar, Ninurta, Shamash and Sin, it is not known if the available documents are entirely representative. Despite appearing frequently in offering lists, she is presently only known from a single theophoric name, Uk-ku-lu-^{d}Na-zi, the first element of which might be Akkadian and mean "exceedingly dark [is]" or less plausibly Elamite, in which case the translation "grandiose" has been proposed.

=== Late attestations ===
A single theophoric name invoking Nanshe is attested in the corpus of texts from Nippur from the Kassite period. According to Wouter Henkelman, it is possible she can also be identified with a deity named Nazit, who occurs in a text from Susa attributed to the Elamite king Untash-Napirisha, a contemporary of the Kassite king Burna-Buriash II (reigned 1359-1355 BCE according to middle chronology). It has been suggested that people from Nina might have settled in the proximity of Susa in the Old Babylonian period already, as evidenced by the presence of a deity named Nasi in theophoric names. Attested examples include Puzur-Nasi and Puzur-Nasit, with the latter according to Ran Zadok using an Akkadianized form of the theonym with a feminine suffix.

The text known as Topography of Babylon or Tintir = Babylon, most likely compiled in the twelfth century, indicates that Nanshe was worshiped in the Esagil temple complex in Babylon, where she had a cultic seat named Ešbanda, "little chamber". Andrew R. George assumes that her presence there was tied to her connection to the god Ea (Enki). A late reference to the cult of Nanshe in the Sealand occurs on a kudurru (inscribed boundary stone) of Enlil-nadin-apli of the Second Dynasty of Isin (eleventh century BCE), which mentions that a parcel of land which was the subject of described dispute had originally been donated by "Gulkišar, king of the Sealand, to Nanše, his lady", though it is not certain if it refers to a historical document. The name is written with the traditional logogram in this case, rather than syllabically as ^{d}Na-zi like in the earlier Sealand texts. Enlil-nādin-apli also mentioned her in a blessing formula alongside Nammu. According to Julia M. Asher-Greve, further attestations of the worship of Nanshe from Babylonia are available from as late as the sixth century BCE.

== Mythology ==
=== Nanshe and the Birds ===
The composition Nanshe and the Birds deals with the connection between the eponymous goddess and the u_{5} bird, variously interpreted as a goose, swan, gull, cormorant, or pelican. Niek Veldhuis refers to it as a goose in his edition of the text, and points out that identifying it as a cormorant, pelican or gull is implausible, as the u_{5} is described in other sources as a grain-eating bird which can raise its voice. Wolfgang Heimpel in the Reallexikon der Assyriologie und Vorderasiatischen Archäologie argues that it is possible the term for the goose was kur-gi_{16}, and u_{5} might refer to the swan instead. Bendt Alster also supported this interpretation. Julia M. Asher-Greve notes that from a comporative perspective it is important to point out that in contrast with swans and geese, cormorants rarely, if ever, appear as symbolic animals in any culture.

The text begins with the encounter between Nanshe and the aforementioned bird. According to Wolfgang Heimpel, after hearing the calls of this animal and noticing its beauty, Nanshe adopted it. Subsequently she descends to the earth, where she erects a temple dedicated to herself, and places the bird from the earlier section at her feet as her symbol. This passage apparently indicates she was believed to be capable of bird-like flight herself. While the rest of the composition is not fully preserved, the surviving passages indicate Nanshe gathers various birds in a single place, and the Anzû bird and the Anunna, in this context the great gods of the pantheon, declare fates for them. The next section is a compilation of short statements about various birds. They provide information about the beliefs pertaining to the individual animals, as well as their behavior, diet and calls. Some of their names are provided with folk etymologies. A number of them are not attested in any other known texts. The text ends with a praise formula addressed to Nanshe.

As of 2004, Nanshe and the Birds was only known from six fragmentary tablets. Five of them come from Nippur, while the sixth is unprovenanced. However, the figures around whom the plot revolves belong to the tradition of Lagash. It is presumed that the composition belonged to the curriculum of Old Babylonian scribal schools.

=== Other myths ===
The composition The Home of the Fish is assumed to feature Nanshe, though her name only occurs in a restored passage. It is sometimes questioned if the restoration is correct, though Niek Veldhuis argues the composition shows a degree of similarity to Nanshe and the Birds, and points out that a number of animal names and uncommon writings of well attested ones are shared by both texts. Both of them, as well as texts such as Dumuzid's Sheep (also called Dumuzid-Inanna W; despite the title it focuses on plants) and Ninurta's Fields, constitute examples of so-called "enumeration literature," Mesopotamian texts in which names from a single lexical category are listed following a specific formula. The plot focuses on a banquet to which a figure referred to as the "queen of the fishermen," often interpreted as Nanshe, invites various fish, presumed to be freshwater species. The final section instead focuses on listing animals which prey on individual fish.

In the myth Enki and Ninhursag, Nanshe is one of the eight deities created by Ninhursag to cure Enki's illness which developed after he consumed a number of plants. Her responsibility in this text is curing the throat of this god. The remaining seven are Abu, Ninsikila (Meskilak), Ningiritud (Ningirida), Ninkasi, Azimua, Ninti and Ensag (Inzak). After Enki recovers from the issues ailing him, new roles are assigned to all of them, with Nanshe's destiny being to marry Nindara. According to Dina Katz, the deities present in this section of the narrative were not chosen based on any theological factors, but due to potential for reinterpreting their names through word play, which in Nanshe's case relies on the fact that zi, the second sign alternate writing of her name, ^{d}Na-zi, could be used to write the word "throat".

Nanshe also appears in Enki and the World Order, where the u_{5} bird standing next to her is apparently an object of Inanna's jealousy. She is mentioned in the latter goddess's complaint about not being assigned a specific position, unlike her divine peers. The domain assigned to Nanshe is the open sea, and the text also states that she was capable of saving people from drowning.

Nanshe appears in the composition preserved on the Gudea cylinders. It is a hymn commemorating the reconstruction of Eninnu, the temple complex of Ningirsu in Girsu. Gudea asks her to reveal the meaning of a dream to him. After he offers bread to her, she reveals to him that his dream was an indication Ningirsu wants him to rebuild the Eninnu, and that he will be supported in this endeavor by his personal god Ningishzida, as well as Nisaba and Nindub.

In the Song of the Plowing Oxen, Nanshe acts as a dream interpreter, and advises the anonymous king who serves as the narrative's protagonist.
