= Gatumdug =

Mesopotamian goddess

- Tutelary goddess of Lagash
- Major cult center: Lagash, NINA, Girsu

Gatumdug (Sumerian: 𒀭𒂷𒉐𒄭; ^{d}Ĝa_{2}-tum_{3}-dug_{3}; also romanized as Gatumdu) was a Mesopotamian goddess regarded as the tutelary deity of Lagash and closely associated with its kings. She was initially worshiped only in this city and in NINA, but during the reign of Gudea a temple was built for her in Girsu. She appears in a number of literary compositions, including the hymn inscribed on the Gudea cylinders and Lament for Sumer and Ur.

== Name and character ==
The meaning of Gatumdug's name is unknown, though it is presumed that it can be classified as linguistically Sumerian. Its emesal form was ma-ze_{2}-ze_{2}-be. She was the tutelary goddess of Lagash, and could be metaphorically described as its mother in Early Dynastic sources. In the hymn inscribed on the Gudea cylinders she is addressed as its divine founder as well.

Some of the early Lagashite kings, including Enanatum I and Enmetena, designated her as their divine mother, though for other rulers of this state role was fulfilled by a different local goddess, Bau, as attested as in the case of Eanatum, Lugalanda and Urukagina). Gatumdug could be described with the term ku_{3}, variously translated as "holy", "sacred", "lustrous" or "shining".

== Associations with other deities ==
It has been suggested in past scholarship that Gatumdug and Bau were initially two names of the same deity, but Gebhard J. Selz considers this implausible. However, they could be syncretised in later sources. A direct equation between them is attested in the god list An = Anum (tablet V, line 62). In an early example of a syncretic hymn, the Old Babylonian composition Ninisina and the gods (Ninisina F in the ETCSL), Gatumdug is instead equated with the eponymous goddess.

On the Gudea cylinders Gatumdug is addressed as a child of An.

== Worship ==
Gatumdug was already worshiped in Lagash in the Early Dynastic period. She appears in one of the Zame Hymns discovered in Abu Salabikh, where she is described as its tutelary goddess. Gebhard J. Selz points out that in Early Dynastic sources from the state of Lagash, she received offerings in the city of Lagash itself as well as in NINA (during festivals of its city goddess Nanshe), but not in Girsu, the city associated with Bau, who in turn did not receive offerings in the former two of these three cities. The construction of a temple dedicated to Gatumdug is mentioned in the inscriptions of Ur-Nanshe, Eannatum and Entemena. The first of these rulers also erected a statue representing her. Bendt Alster pointed out that the inscription commemorating this event, which also mentions statues of Nanshe and Shulsaga, is the oldest known text to directly mention anthropomorphic statues of deities. Sources from Lagash state that the temple was set on fire by Lugalzagesi, who also stole precious metals and lapis lazuli from it and destroyed statues displayed in it. Despite her apparent importance in Lagash, Gatumdug is ultimately relatively sparsely attested in Early Dynastic sources. She was also not invoked in theophoric names in this period. Attested members of her clergy include a sanga (temple administrator) and a nin-dingir priestess.

Gatumdug retained her importance under the reign of Gudea. He referred to himself as her child. One of his year names refers to the construction of a temple dedicated to her. It was located in Girsu. He also dedicated a statue representing him as an architect to her in the same city. According to another of his inscriptions she assigned a lamma (tutelary protective deity) to him. Passages alluding to this event are considered evidence of lamma being regarded as separate from a personal deity, as it is well attested that Ningishzida played this role for said ruler.

Gatumdug continued to be worshiped in the Ur III period. A temple dedicated to her continued to operate. Various offerings were made to her, including butter, cheese, flour and dates. A bead dedicated to her for the life of king Ibbi-Sin by a certain E-ḫegal is also known.

== In literature ==
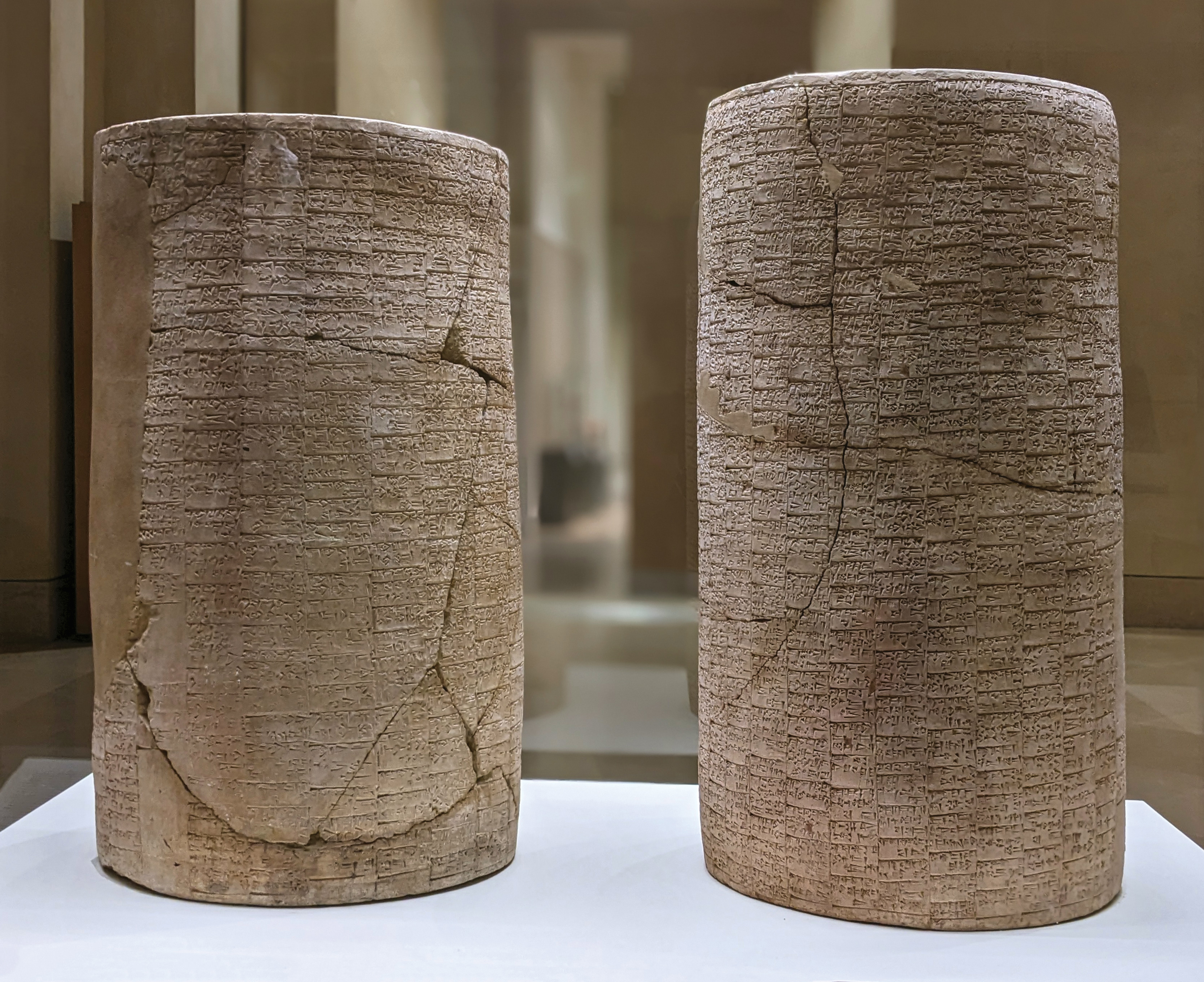
Gudea cylinders. Louvre.

Gatumdug is mentioned in the text inscribed on the Gudea cylinders, a hymn commemorating the rebuilding of Ningirsu's temple E-ninnu. She is the first of the deities the eponymous ruler consults regarding the meaning of his dreams. In his inquiry he refers to her as his mother and father. She subsequently provides the bricks needed for his construction project.

In the Lament for Sumer and Ur, composed after the fall of the Third Dynasty of Ur, Gatumdug is one of the goddesses who abandon their cult centers during the described disaster.

An indirect late reference to Gatumdug occurs in a bilingual (Sumero-Akkadian) hymn to Shulgi. It was discovered in Nippur and dates to the Old Babylonian period. It is attributed to an individual bearing the theophoric name Ur-Gatumdug, addressed as an apkallu.
