= Nindub =

Mesopotamian god

- Divine exorcist
- Major cult center: Lagash, Girsu, NINA

Nindub or Ninduba was a Mesopotamian god associated with exorcisms. He is attested chiefly in sources from the state of Lagash, including Early Dynastic offering lists and the cylinders of Gudea. He continued to be worshiped in this area in the Ur III period. However, in the Old Babylonian period he appears only in a small number of god lists presumed to reflect archaic tradition.

== Name and character ==
Nindub's name was written in cuneiform as ^{d}nin-dub or less commonly as ^{d}nin-dub-ba. It is conventionally translated as "lord (of the) clay tablet". However, Gebhard J. Selz argues that based on the pairing of this god with the deity ^{d}nin-ùr in offering lists from Lagash suggests that his name initially might have been depended on another meaning of the sign dub, "to smooth", which was an antonym of ùr, "to pile up".

Based on Nindub's role in the literary text inscribed on the cylinders of Gudea it is presumed that he functioned as a divine exorcist.

The proposal that Nindub was identical with Nindara is regarded as baseless.

== Attestations ==
Nindub is attested for the first time in the Early Dynastic god list from Fara. He might also be mentioned in the contemporary riddles from Lagash, though in this context the name might be an epithet of Nanshe, rather than a separate deity. An alternate interpretation is that the text only associates him with this goddess. Offering lists from the same state focused on the circle of Nanshe indicate that Nindub regularly received offerings in her cult center NINA (Tell Zurghul), typically alongside the deity ^{d}nin-ùr. He is also attested in the theophoric name Ur-Nindub.

An inscription commemorating the construction of a temple for Nindub by Gudea is known from copies from Uruk and Tell Zurghul. The king addresses him as “his master” in it. According to Andrew R. George it is uncertain in which of these cities it was located, and its ceremonial name remains unknown. Nindub is also mentioned on the cylinders of Gudea. The composition inscribed on them, characterized by Dietz Otto Edzard as a "temple hymn", is among the longest known literary texts written in Sumerian and commemorates the reconstruction of the E-ninnu, the temple of Ningirsu in Girsu. Nindub is described in it as a warrior holding a lapis lazuli plate on which he engraved a plan of the temple. As the "foremost lustration priest of Eridu" he is responsible for providing incense for it. It is presumed that this indicates he was linked to exorcisms and incantations. When the preparations were finished, he "caused the sanctuary to be full of clatter and noise".

Nindub continued to be worshiped in Lagash and Girsu in the Ur III period. However, only two references to him are known from the Old Babylonian period, and both of them are entries in god lists presumed to reflect more archaic compositions belonging to this genre. In the case of the Mari god list, the reading ^{d}nin-dub suggested by Grégoire Nicolet (as opposed to ^{d}nin-UM originally proposed by Wilfred G. Lambert) depends on the proximity of Ninmada, who like Nindub appears in the text known from the cylinders of Gudea.
