= Shul-utula =

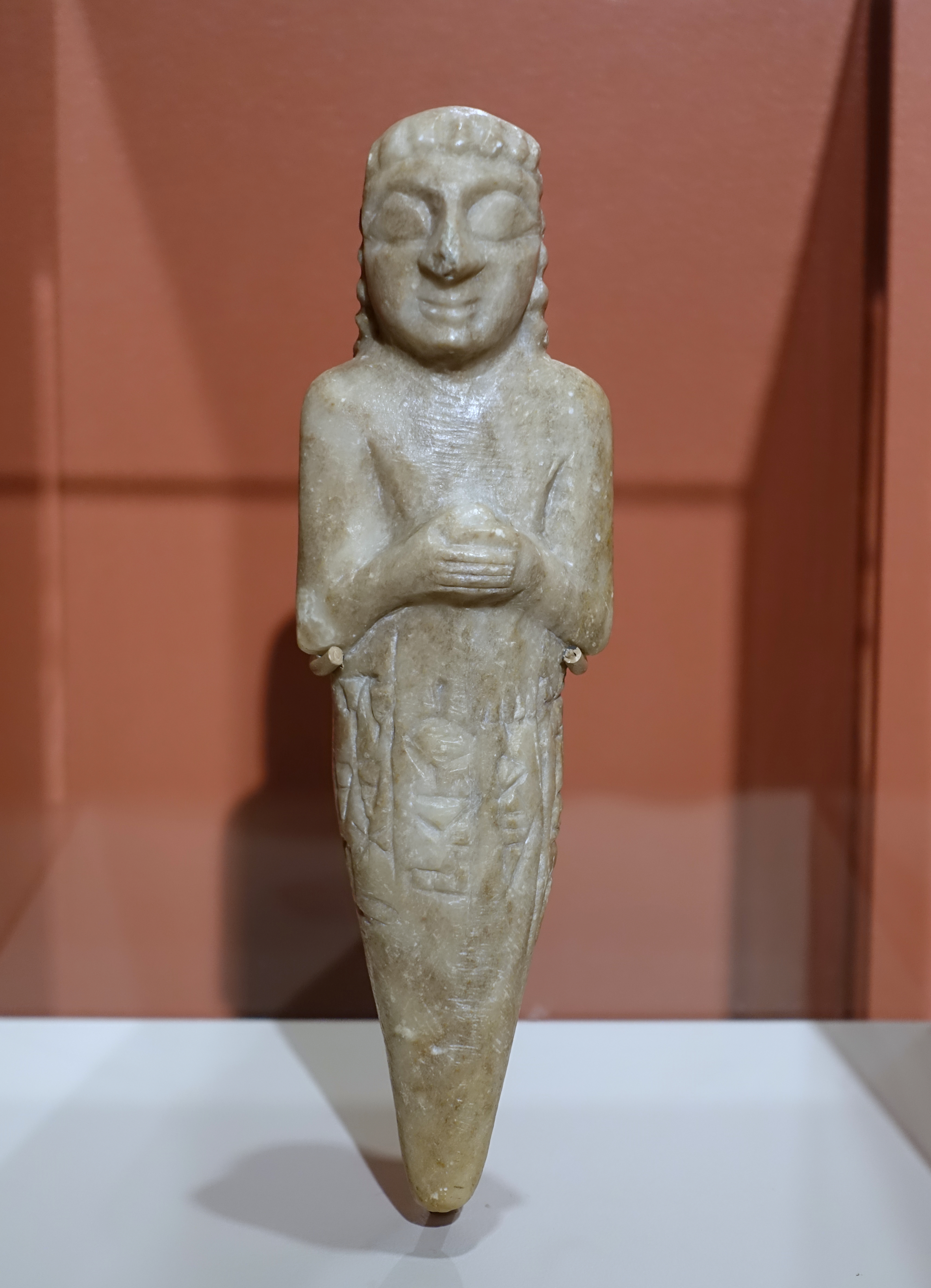
Shut-utul in the form of a foundation peg, with inscription "Ur-Nanshe, King of Lagash, son of Gunidu, built the shrine Girsu", probably Girsu, Tell Telloh, Iraq, mid 3rd millennium BCE. Harvard Semitic Museum, Cambridge, MA

Shul-utul (Sumerian: 𒀭𒂄𒀖𒇻, ^{D}šul-utul₁₀) or Shul-utula was the personal god of the rulers of the Mesopotamian Ur-Nanshe dynasty of Lagash. His name means "youngling shepherd" in Sumerian.

Despite his role as the personal deity of kings, Shul-utul was not regarded as a deity associated with ruling, and it is possible his role was instead connected to personal luck. It is also possible that, similar to Ninshubur, he was envisioned as capable of mediating with higher ranked gods on behalf of humans under his protection. One document states that he helped kings with building temples in Girsu. He is mentioned in inscriptions in association with rulers such as Entemena and Eannatum.

Shut-utul is mostly attested in association with temples of other deities. Seven foundation figurines from the Ibgal temple, which dedicated to Inanna, are assumed to be depictions of Shul-utul. He was also worshiped in Emah (Sumerian: "exalted house"), a shrine of Nanshe located in Girsu.

The only certain attestation of Shul-utul from the Ur III period is the personal name Ur-Shul-utul. None are known from later periods.
