= Tell Zurghul =

Archaeological site in Iraq

- Location within Iraq
- 31°22′36.53976″N 46°29′44.61918″E
- Type: Settlement
- Periods: Ubaid 4, Uruk, Early Dynastic, Ur III
- Location: Dhi Qar Province, Iraq
- Region: Mesopotamia

History
- Built: 4th millennium BC

Site notes
- Area: 70 ha (170 acres)
- Excavation dates: 1887, 2015-present
- Archaeologists: Robert Koldewey, Davide Nadali, Andrea Polcaro

Tell Zurghul (also spelled Tell Surghul, rarely Surghûl, Zerghul, or Zerghûl) is an archaeological site in Dhi Qar Governorate (Iraq). Its ancient name was the cuneiform read as Niĝin (or Nina or Ninua). The city god was Nanshe (Nanše), who had temples there (E-sirara) and at nearby Girsu. She was the daughter of Enki and sister of Ningirsu and Nisaba. Her husband Nindara was also worshiped at the site.

Niĝin, along with the cities of Girsu and Lagash (7 km NW), was part of the State of Lagash in the later part of the 3rd Millennium BC. In a text of Early Dynastic IIIb ruler of Lagash Urukagina it reads "For Nanshe he constructed the Nigin-Going-River, built the Eninnu at its beginning, Sirara House at its end". It has been suggested that Hendursaga and Nindub were also worshipped at Nigin.

The city lay on a branch of the ancient Iturungal canal, the southern of two major east west canals in Mesopotamia, that ran from Lagash then south to Tell Zurghu and then to Gu'abba.

"Two effluents took off from the left bank of the Iturungal, the Id-Ninaki-gen-a, which over Bzeikh (Zabalam) flowed to Telloh (Girsu), al Hibba (Uru-ku, Lagas?), and Surghul (Nina) ..."

== Archaeology ==
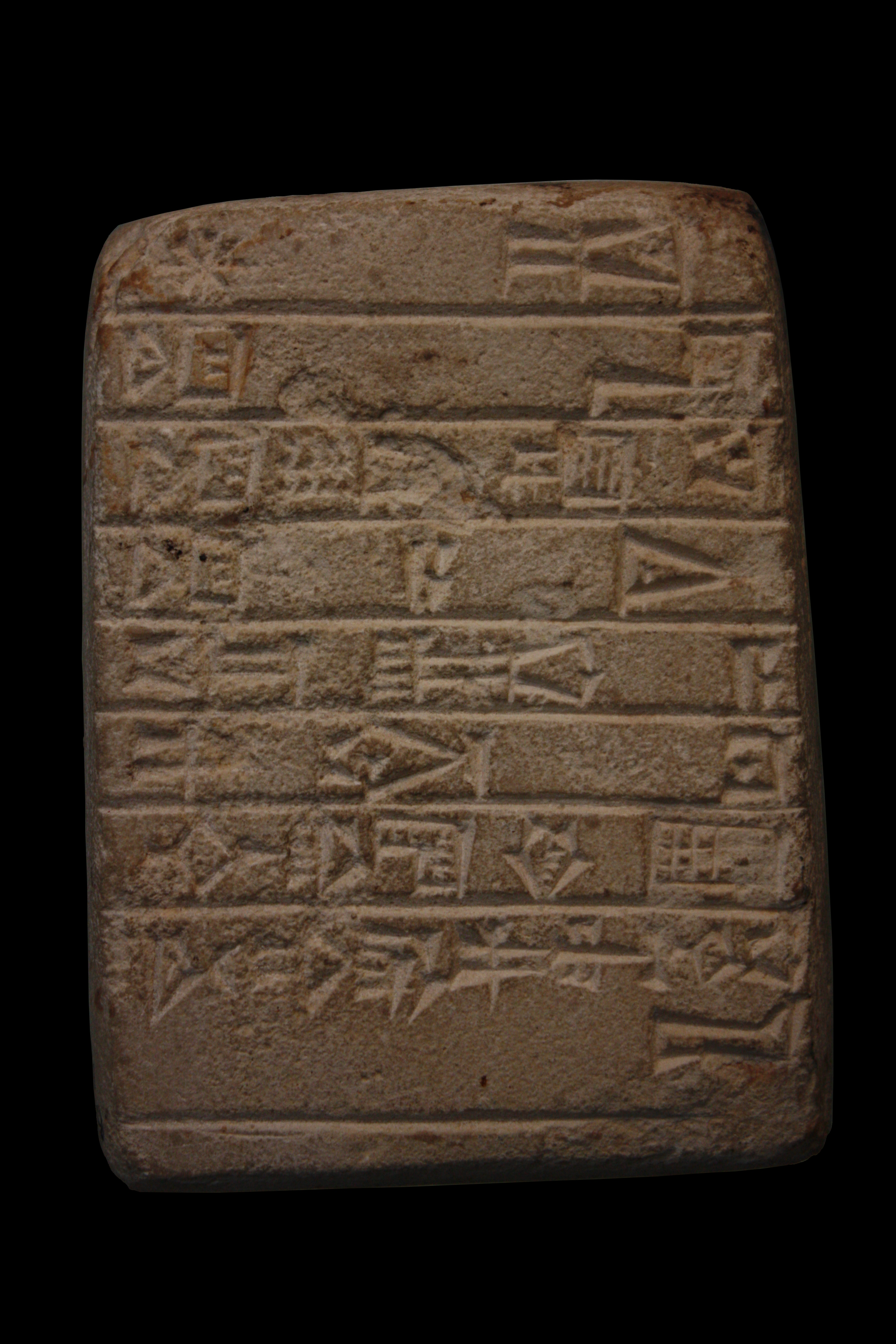
Foundation tablet. The inscriptions record the rebuilding of the temple of Nanshe in Nina by Gudea

According to the current excavators, Tell Zurghul covers 70 hectares with two mounds. One mound, known as Mound A, stands 15 meters high and is the site of ancient Nigin. The other mound, Mound B, is about 150 meters to the south and rises to 5 meters in height. Additionally, there is an extensive Lower Town. The western edge of the site features a 200 x 150m feature (Area C) that remains unidentified.

The site was discovered by J. G. Taylor in 1855. On January 31, 1885, the site, then called Surghul, was visited by William Hayes Ward. During the winter of 1913-14 Comte Aymar de Liedekerke-Beaufort visited Surghul. In 1926, the site was visited during an archaeological survey of southern Mesopotamia by Raymond P. Dougherty of Yale University under the auspices of the American Schools of Oriental Research. He reported that it covered 200 acres and had two mounds, on 45 feet high and the other 25 feet high. The few scattered finds were mainly pottery shards, flint saw blades, and broken bricks. Some bricks and a cone had an inscription of Gudea. The mounds were surrounded by water. In the 1970s, American archaeologists working at nearby Lagash visited twice collecting, 4 bricks and 12 cones.

The first excavations at Tell Zurghul, led Robert Koldewey, occurred January 4 to February 1887 under the auspices of the Royal Prussian Museums for Berlin. Besides digging long, deep trenches in Area A and Area B, Koldewey collected 16 clay cones. A number of graves, both interments and cremations, were examined during this period including an Old Babylonian period graveyard. Unfortunately, as is often the case with early excavations, very little information is available regarding excavation records from Koldewey's efforts. Scattered clay cones, generally diagnostic of the Uruk period, were found out of context on the surface.

Since 2015 Zurghul has been excavated by Italian Archaeological Expedition, under the auspices of Sapienza University of Rome and Perugia University, led by Davide Nadali and Andrea Polcaro. Work was continued in 2016, 2017, 2019 and the most recent excavation season in 2021. Another season is planned for 2022. There is a deep cut (35 meters by 3.5 meters) in the south-eastern slope of the larger mound (Mound B) from the German excavations. A small (6.5 meters by 5.5 meters) pit was found at the top of that mound and is assumed to also be from the German excavations.

One foundation tablet and one foundation figurine of Gudea were found at Tell Zurghul.

=== Area A ===
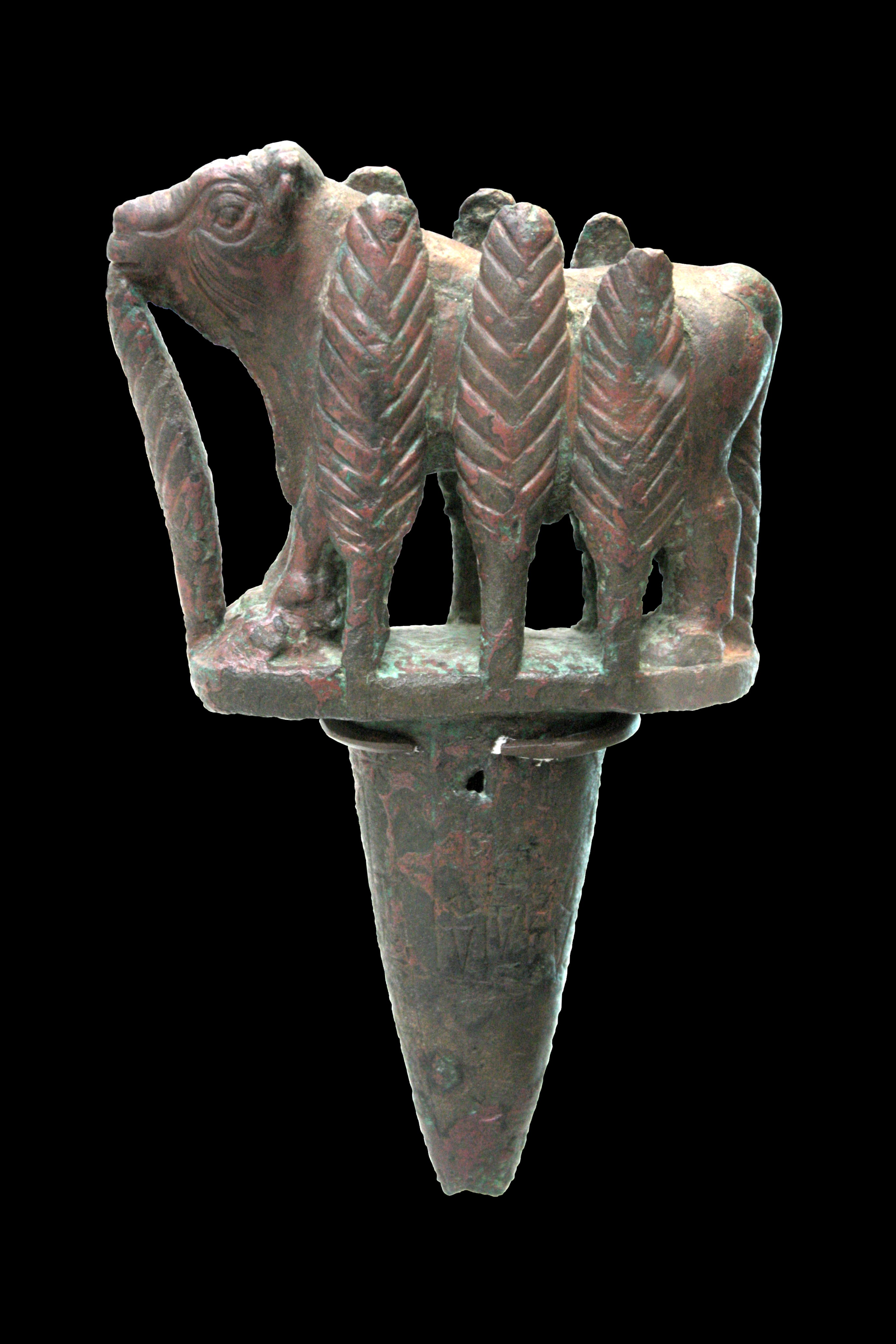
Foundation peg - the temple of Nanshe in Nina by Gudea

In the excavations led by Davide Nadali and Andrea Polcaro in 2015-2016, an open area of 15m by 10m was opened at the base of Area A, at its southern side. This area was selected due to its topographical location in a central area of Tell Zurghul, and for the presence of gypsum bricks that had been revealed due to erosion from the rain.

This excavation revealed different architectural layers belonging to a large mud-brick building, which has been identified so far as two main historical phases, as well as a large courtyard with a beaten earth floor to the west of the building, delimited by an outer wall. Part of the building contains a room with a partially preserved western and northern wall, the northern wall being made of Riemchen mud-bricks, whilst the upper part of the western wall was made of gypsum bricks. Several jars typical of the Jemdet Nasr period were found deposited within the room, as well as goblets in an inner room.

In the courtyard, a tannur oven with a bench was recovered, as well as several conical bowls containing residue of organic matter alongside several flint blades and an obsidian blade. Traces of an installation thought to be a small table were also detected immediately south of the tannur. This area has thus been interpreted as a production area, specifically one for the cooking of food.

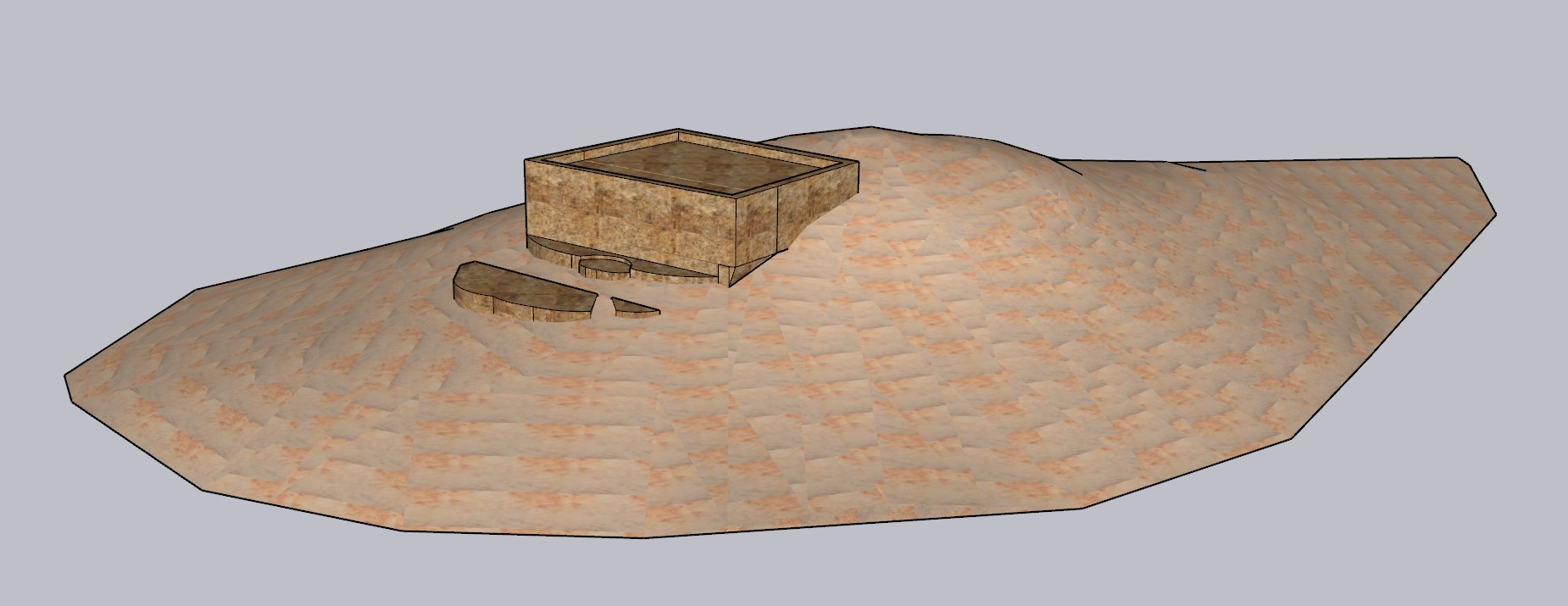
3-D reconstruction of Area D by Kaykaybot

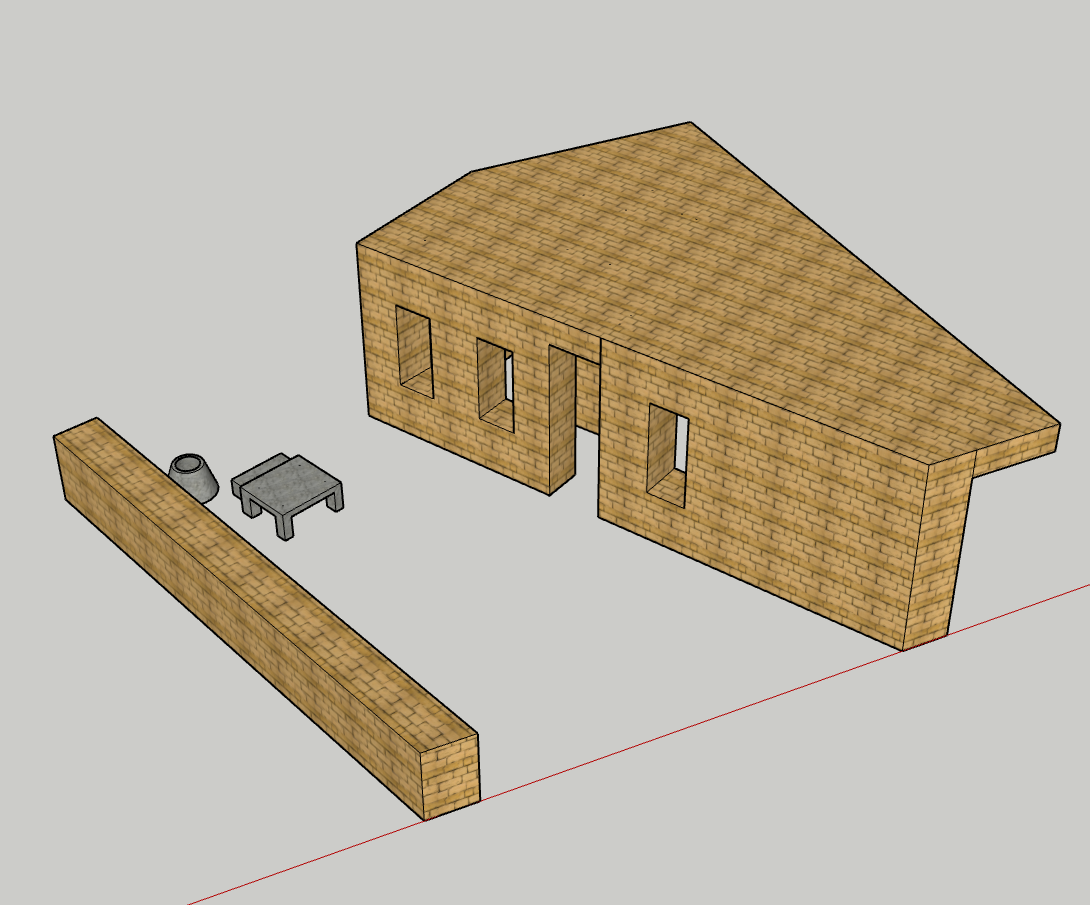
3-D reconstruction of Area A by lswlam

=== Area B ===
Area B (0.7 ha in area and about 4 meters above the plain) is located on the western side of Mound B. It was excavated in 2015, 2017, 2019, and 2021. In the 1887 excavation a trench had been excavated on the southeast slope and a small sondage dug on the top of the mound. Finds, including seven censers (pottery stands) similar to those found in Eridu Temple VI, have been all from the Ubaid 4 period. Three occupational layers have been exposed. In 2019 the area was extended into the area of the old German pit. In this portion remains from Ubaid to Ur III were found, including a brick of Entemena of Lagash and a geometric stamp seal.

=== Area C ===
This section, in the Lower Town, has so far only been subjected to a surface survey.

=== Area D ===
Area D is located at the top of Mound A, on its southern slope. The site was first excavated by Koldewey in 1887, where due to the use of a large sounding trench, heavy erosion of the upper strata was observed in later excavation.

In 2015-2017, Nadali and Polcaro sought to locate the location of the temple complex Sirara, dedicated to the goddess Nanshe. The temple was said to be built by Gudea, and described as the “Mountain Lifted Above All (Other) Houses”. The south-eastern foot of Mound A was found to contain inscribed cones and bricks from Gudea, hypothesized to have slid down from the original location of the temple at the top of the mound over time.

Nadali and Polcaro opened a 11 x 10m trench to the south of Koldewey's sounding trench in order to analyse the nature and stratigraphy of Mound A. The excavations revealed two phases of terracing and leveling. This artificial terracing of mud with baked brick fragments contributed to the shape of Mound A. Pottery and other materials found on these platforms were attributed to the Akkad/ Ur III period, corresponding to the rule of Gudea. The excavations also demonstrated an accumulation of strata that may be explained by the continuous destruction and rebuilding of the sacred site.

At present, there is no archaeological evidence reported at Area D that can be identified as the Sirara temple without a doubt. One hypothesis is that stratification of the mound began in the early 3rd millennium BC, before Gudea (who ruled in the 2nd millennium BC) refurbished the site and built Sirara on top.

=== Area E ===
Work in this section, a 5 meter by 20 meter rectangle, along the south-western slope of Mound A, began in 2019. The goal was to determine occupation before the building of the temple by Gudea. So far recoveries are from the Early Akkadian period.

=== Area F ===
This is located in the Lower Town to the west of the main mounds. The work was started in 2021 after a 2017 drone survey found indications of possible rectilinear structures. Sections examined so far appear to have been used for cooking. Work will continue here in 2022.

== History ==
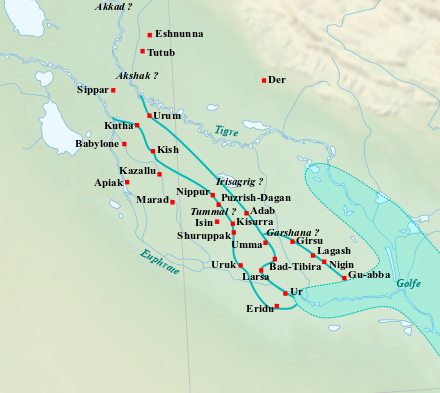
Map of the main cities of Lower Mesopotamia during the Ur III period (c. 2100-2000 BC), with the approximate course of the rivers and the ancient shoreline of the Gulf

Excavations have found stratified evidence of occupation in the Ubaid period (Ubaid 4), Late Uruk period, Early Jemdet Nasr, and Early Dynastic I period. Out of context finds and textual evidence support a strong occupation in the Early Dynastic III Period of the First and Second Dynasties of Lagash. The former is represented by inscriptions of Enmetena and the latter by those of Gudea who was responsible for major rebuilding of Sirara, the temple of the goddess Nanshe originally built by Ur-Nanshe. The city was recorded as having been destroyed by the Elamites about the time of the fall of the Third Dynasty of Ur. ‘The Lamentation over the Destruction of Sumer and Ur' has Nanshe declaring "Alas, the destroyed city, my destroyed temple!". The excavators have speculated that the paucity of Early Dynastic III remains is the result of that destruction.

The temple hymn of Nanshe begins:

"Is it not the city, is it not the city, is its me not proclaimed? Is it not ABxHA^{ki}, the city, is its me not proclaimed? Is it not the pure city, the city, is its me not proclaimed? Is it not the mountain risen from the water, the city, is its me not proclaimed ..."

The pronunciation of ABxHA^{ki} is uncertain so the exact name of the site is also uncertain and Nunua (ni-nu-a), Nina, Nigin, na-an-Se, and Sirara (si-ra-ra) have been used.

Phases Mound A (Areas D and E):

- Phase V (ED I-IIIA)
- Phase IV-III (ED IIIA/B (c. 2500 BCE), ED IIIB (c. 2500-2350 BCE), ED IVA1), ED IIIB, Early Akkadian.
- Phase II-I (ED ED IVA-B, ED IVB) Late Akkadian, Post-Akkadian, Early Ur III (c. 2112 BCE).

== See also ==
- Cities of the ancient Near East
- Gu'abba
