= Gu'abba =

Ancient city in Iraq

Gu'abba (Gú-ab-ba^{ki}), also Gu-abba and Guabba, was the name of a city but also in the Ur III period the name of the district around it. It was active in the Early Dynastic III through the Akkadian Empire and Ur III periods. It is known that there was a large harbor and shipyard (mar-sa), where "'big boats' (má-gal-gal) or 'Makkan boats' (má Má-ganki)" were built, that handled trade with the Persian Gulf entities not just for the Girsu province but for other parts of the Ur III Empire as well. These ships had a crew as large as 120 men. There were also regular shipments of sesame stalks reaped in Susa and received at Gu'abba. Susa is known to have had a harbor at that time. In the Ur III period a transportation and messenger resthouse was established in Gu'abba.

The city also had a palace, several temples, large granaries,and a large textile industry which mostly processed wool. There were over 4000 weavers employed at Gu'abba along with about 6000 support personnel. The weavers were of some status and were provided with meat and sesame oil. Texts from the Ur III period record that there was a "village of traveling merchants" from Meluhha in Gu'abba.

Nin-MAR.KI is the city goddess of Gu'abba. A year name of Ur-Baba, a ruler of the 2nd dynasty of Lagash who preceded Gudea was "Year in which the temple of Ninmarki in Gu'abba was built". The temple owned large segments of the land and industry in the city. There was also a shrine to the deified ruler Shulgi in the city. The city was mentioned in Sumerian temple hymns as "a house which extends over the midst of the sea". In the Sumerian literary composition Lament for Sumer and Ur it states:

"Enlil brought down Elam, the foe, from the mountain, He made Nanse, the princely daughter, to dwell in a strange city. He put Ninmar to the flames in the shrine Gu'abba, Its silver and lapis lazuli is carried off in big boats. The queen—her possessions destroyed completely—the holy Ninmar ..."

In a text of the Lagash ruler Gudea it states

"To Ninmar, pretty woman, first child of Nanše, his lady, did Gudea, governor of Lagash, her wall of Guabba, the corral, build; within her house he built for her."

== History ==
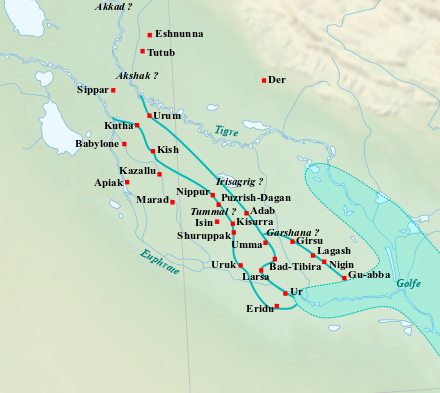
Map of the main cities of Lower Mesopotamia during the Ur III period (c. 2100-2000 BC), with the approximate course of the rivers and the ancient shoreline of the Gulf

The city was known in the Early Dynastic II and Akkadian Empire periods

but did not become prominent until the time of the Ur III Empire. In the Ur III period the nation-states of Girsu and Lagash, independent powers during the Early Dynastic period, were combined into a single province with an area of around 3000 square kilometers extending 80 kilometers north to south and 40 kilometers east to west which is sometimes referred to as Girsu and sometimes as Ĝirsu-Lagaš. Canals connected the major cities of Girsu, Lagaš, Nigen, and Guabba. It consisted of three districts, Ĝirsu, Kinunir-NIĜIN ("the banks of the canal flowing towards NIĜIN") and Gu'abba ("the sea shore"). The Kinunir-NIĜIN district included the towns of Lagaš, Kinunir, NIĜIN (Tell Zurghul), Kiesa/Kiessa/Ki'eš, and Urub and had temples of Inanna, Dumuzi-abzu (Kinunir), Nanše (Ningin), Nindara (Ki'eš), Bagara, Ĝatumdu, and Lugal-Urub (Urub). There were also known to have been shrines to the deified ruler Shulgi in that district, at Nina, Kiešsa, Kinunir, and Guabba. The Gu'abba district included Gu'abba, Old Gu'abba, Asuna, Hurim, and Gukara. In this period the coastline was receding to the south and it is thought that Old Gu'abba was on the former coastline. Other known towns were Kisura, Kalamsaga, and Kimadasal. Kinunir is closely associated with Niĝin. Kinunir and Niĝin have also been referred to as "satellites" of Gu'abba.

The "Going-to-Nigin Canal", known as early as the Early Dynastic III period, linked the cities of Girsu, Lagash, Nigin, and Gu'abba. During this period the northern coastline of the Persian Gulf would have been much further to the north then it currently is.

== Location ==
The location of Gu'abba is unknown though its general area is known to be in the southeastern part of the ancient Girsu province and on what would have been the north coastline of the Persian Gulf in that period. It is also known to have been on a canal linking it to other cities in the province. Text indicate that it was 12 days travel by boat from Gu'abba to Puzrish-Dagan and also that is five "towing days" from Girsu to Gu'abba. A towing day was about 10 kilometers. Ur III texts indicate that by the time the sea had continued to recede and that by then Gu'abba was several days travel from the sea.

One proposal for the city's location is Ishan Hoffa which is 65 kilometers east of Girsu. Another proposal is Tell Ijdaiwah, 63 kilometers south of Girsu. A final proosal is an unnamed site 58 kilometers south-east of Girsu. None of these proposals has gained support as their size and occupation period are not appropriate. A further proposal is Tell Turoum which lies about 10 kilometers south of Nigin (47 km southeast of Girsu, and 18 km southeast of Lagash). The site has an area of about 30 hectares and a surface survey indicates occupation in the Early Dynastic III through the Third dynasty of Ur periods.

== Kinunir ==
Kinunir (ša3 ki-nu-nir^{ki}), also Kinirsha, was a town in the southern region of Mesopotamia, occupied in the Early Dynastic III, Akkadian Empire, and Ur III periods. It is still unlocated. Rarely, it is called Kinirša. It is first mentioned in the Early Dynastic III period as one of the places, along with Ki'eš, sacked by Lugal-Zage-Si. It had a temple of the god Dumuzi-abzu, E-Kinirsha, as well as a shrine to the deified Ur III ruler Shulgi.

Ur III ruler Shulgi established a roadhouse at Kinunir which was on primary trade route between Ur and Susa, which was then part of the Ur III Empire. Texts show a number of Elamites housed there in transit. As an example a text lists provisions for 30 Elamites and to Simmu, the "man of Marhasi" on the way to Drehem. In another text the 30 are called "Elamites of Marhasii". Similar roadhouses were established at Girsu and Gu'abba.

Patronyms like "Lu-Kinunir" and Ki-nu-nir-ki-du_{10} "Kinunir is a good place" are known from this period.

== See also ==
- Chronology of the ancient Near East
- Cities of the ancient Near East
- List of Mesopotamian dynasties
- Umma–Lagash war
