= Hendursaga =

Mesopotamian god

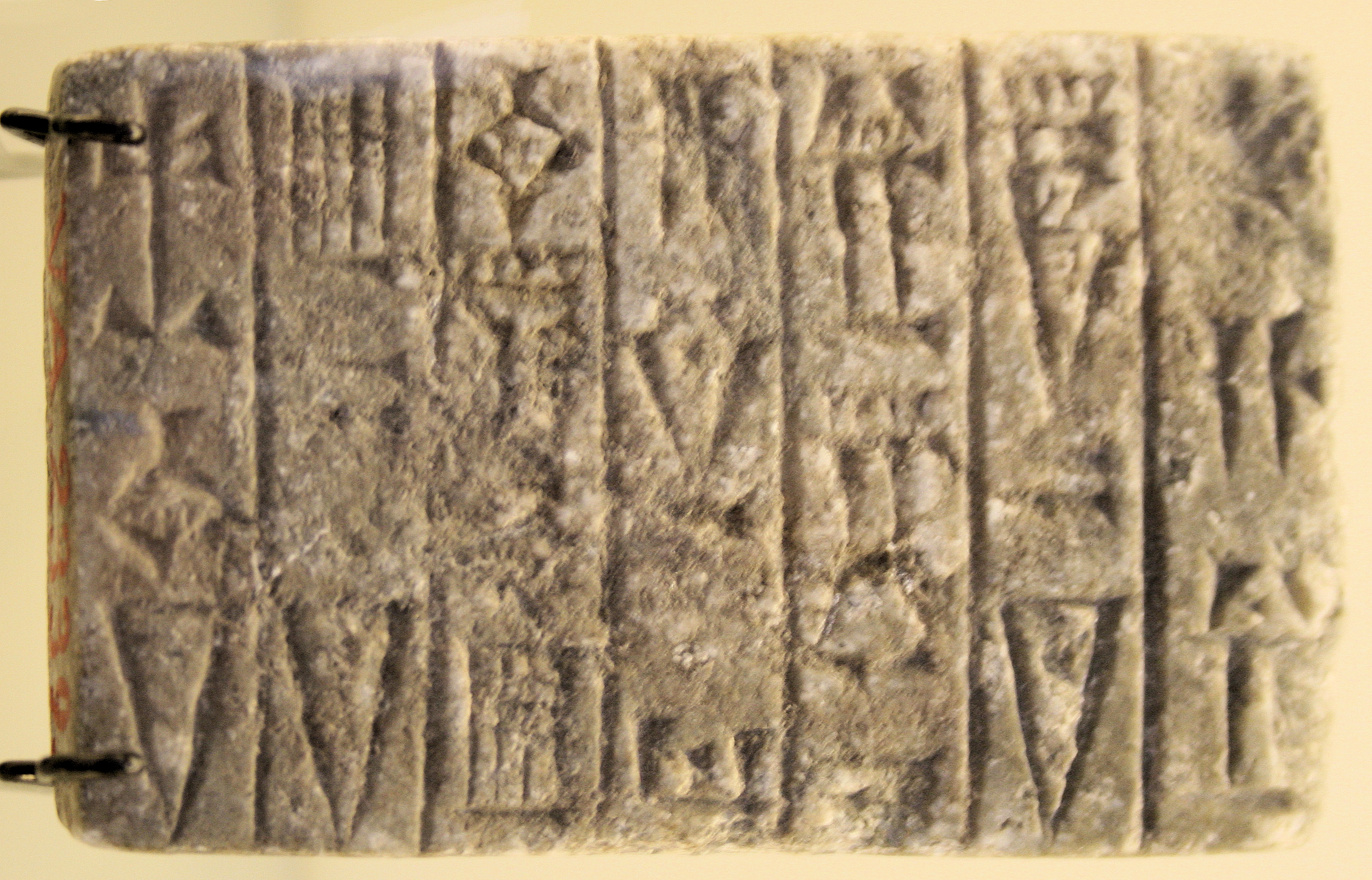
Dedication tablet by Gudea, Governor of Lagash: "For Hendursaga, his master, Gudea, ruler of Lagash, built his house." Vorderasiatisches Museum, Berlin.

Hendursaga (𒀭𒉺𒊕, ^{D}ḫendur-saŋ), also spelled Hendursanga or Endursaga (𒀭𒉺𒊕𒂷, ^{D}ḫendur-saŋ-ŋa_{2}) was a Mesopotamian god. He was regarded as a divine night watchman. He was commonly associated with the goddess Nanshe. In a number of god lists, he was equated with the similar Akkadian god Ishum.

== Character ==
The etymology of the name Hendursaga is uncertain. However, it is possible it was related to his functions and can be translated from Sumerian as "torch (or staff) bearer who goes in front." The word ḫendur is otherwise unattested, but it is assumed that it is related to Akkadian ḫuṭāru, a type of staff.

Hendursaga was a divine watchman. He has been characterized as a "protective god with a friendly face." Attested epithets attributed only to him include "chief herald," "watchman of the street," and "lamp of the people," applied only to him, as well as "chief herald," "high constable," "herald of the silent street," and "herald of the silent night," and "hero who goes about at night," shared with Ishum. The text Marduk's address to demons refers to him as "the god who wanders the thoroughfares." According to Andrew R. George, the word nimgir/nāgiru, present in many of these epithets, which is conventionally translated as "herald." in this context should be understood as "constable," "town cryer" or "night watchman."

== Associations with other deities ==
Starting in the Old Babylonian period, Hendursaga came to be equated with Ishum in bilingual contexts, with the former appearing in Sumerian and the latter in Akkadian formulas. They were also equated with each other in the Weidner and Nippur God lists, and such an equation may also be attested in a copy of An = Anum, though due to state of preservation and possible scribal errors this is uncertain. Another god closely related to both of them was Engidudu, who was the divine guardian of the Tabira Gate in the city of Assur. In the Epic of Erra, Engidudu is used as an alternate name for Ishum.

Hendursaga was also closely associated with Nanshe. According to a hymn dedicated to him, she bestowed his functions, as well as his insignia, a staff (or perhaps a torch) upon him. Hendursaga was also believed to have served as her advisor and cooperate with her steward Enniglulu.

In a hymn to Nanshe, Hendursaga is called a son of Utu.

It is possible that in the third millennium BCE, his wife was Dumuziabzu, the tutelary goddess of Kinunir (Kinirsha), a city in the state of Lagash, though in that period family relations between deities were often particularly fluid or uncertain. In a later tradition his wife was Ninmug, a goddess of crafts and birth from Kisiga. This was a secondary development based on the equivalence between him and Ishum, whose spouse Ninmug usually was.

In a Sumerian hymn to Hendursaga, he is stated as being assisted by three groups of seven attendants. This first group of seven is described in detail in the hymn. They were known as "warriors", and it is theorized that this heptad is related to the Sebitti heptad which developed in later times. It is unclear if they are animal hybrids, or instead magical animals. Each is associated with one specific creature: A fox, dog, two birds (one described as pecking at insects, possibly a raven, the other huge vulture, devouring carrion), wolf, nin-imma bird (probably an owl) and a shark.

== Worship ==
Hendursaga was one of the deities chiefly associated with the area controlled by the state of Lagash.

A chapel of Hendursaga might have existed in Ur, next to one possibly dedicated to Ninshubur. Identification of both of these sanctuaries is based on inscribed mace heads found during excavations. However, it has also been argued that these objects might have no cultic function.

According to a hymn dedicated to Hendursaga, it was believed that lighting a torch and invoking his name guaranteed safe passage through city streets at night. An incantation implores him for protection from demons, including galla, maškim, udug and "evil lamma." While the lamma was normally understood as a type of benevolent protective minor goddess, multiple references to "evil lamma" (^{d}lama hul) are also known, though they are uncommon. An "evil lamma" is listed in a similar enumeration of demons in a text dedicated to the medicine goddess Ninisina.
