= Sirara =

Sumerian temple or city

At the beginning of 3rd dynasty of Ur, Sirara (Sumerian: 𒌓𒈣𒀏𒆠𒋳 SIRARA_{6}) was a temple complex in Lagash - it may also (or instead) have been a city as mentioned in The Royal Chronicle of Lagaš. It has been suggested that the city-state known as Sirara was also called Nina or Nimin, which was probably a seaport.
