= Ḫegir =

Mesopotamian goddess

- Divine lukur of Ningirsu
- Major cult center: Lagash, Girsu
- Parents: Ningirsu and Bau

Ḫegir (𒀭𒃶𒄈) or Ḫegirnunna (𒀭𒃶𒄈𒉣𒈾) was a Mesopotamian goddess who belonged to the pantheon of Lagash. She was considered a daughter of Bau and Ningirsu.

== Name ==
The reading of the first cuneiform sign in the theonym ^{d}ḪÉ-gír(-nun-na) is not certain. Among the authors who employ the form Ḫegir(nunna) are Wilfred G. Lambert and Andrew R. George. Toshiko Kobayashi omits the breve below the first consonant, and renders the name as Hegir. The romanization Gangir has also been proposed, and has been adopted for example by Mark Cohen. Kobayashi refers to Ḫegirnunna as the full form of the name, but Gebhard J. Selz notes that the difference between the variants seems to be chronological, with the shorter form being older.

It is assumed that gír in the short form and gír-nun in the long one both refer to a procession route located in Girsu, and that ḪÉ might represent an allograph of the word gemé, which makes it possible to translate the name from Sumerian as "the maid of the (lofty) way".

== Associations with other deities ==
An inscription from the reign of Urukagina refers to Ḫegir as the "beloved lukur of Ningirsu," while in another, from the time of Gudea, she is directly referred to as the daughter of this god and Bau. The latter can be found on Gudea Cylinder B. The term lukur referred to a class of priestesses, and the existence of a group of nine women bearing this title who took part in the cult of Ningirsu is attested in Early Dynastic texts from Girsu. It has been proposed that lukur were understood as the junior wives of a god.

Alongside Shulshaga and Igalim, who were also regarded as children of Bau and Ningirsu, as well as divine servants such as Lammašaga, Ḫegir belonged to the household of these two deities. In the times of Gudea, she belonged to a group referred to as "the seven lukur priestesses of Ningirsu" and "the septuplets of Bau", which also included Zazaru, Nipa'e, Urnunta-ea, Ḫesaga, Zurmu and Zarmu. However, according to Gebhard J. Selz Ḫegir was originally a deity of greater importance than the other six, and it is possible that initially only Urnunta-ea, Zazaru and Nipa'e, who also occur together in an earlier inscription from the reign of Urukagina, formed a group.

== Worship ==
Ḫegir is first attested in Early Dynastic documents from the state of Lagash. Urukagina built a temple dedicated to her, most likely in Girsu, though its ceremonial name is not preserved in any known sources. According to Mark Cohen, during a "courtyard festival"(ezem-kisal-la) of Bau, Ḫegir received offerings alongside Ningirsu, Bau, Shulsagana, Igalim, Ninšar, Ninshubur, Ninazu and "the genie of the Etarsirsir." She also appears in various offering lists alongside a similar selection of deities. Since she received less offerings than Igalim and Shulsaga overall, with roughly identical amount of food offered to all three but no sacrificial animals meant for Ḫegir attested in known texts, it is assumed she was a deity of lesser importance than them.
