= Igalim =

Mesopotamian god

- Divine "bailiff"
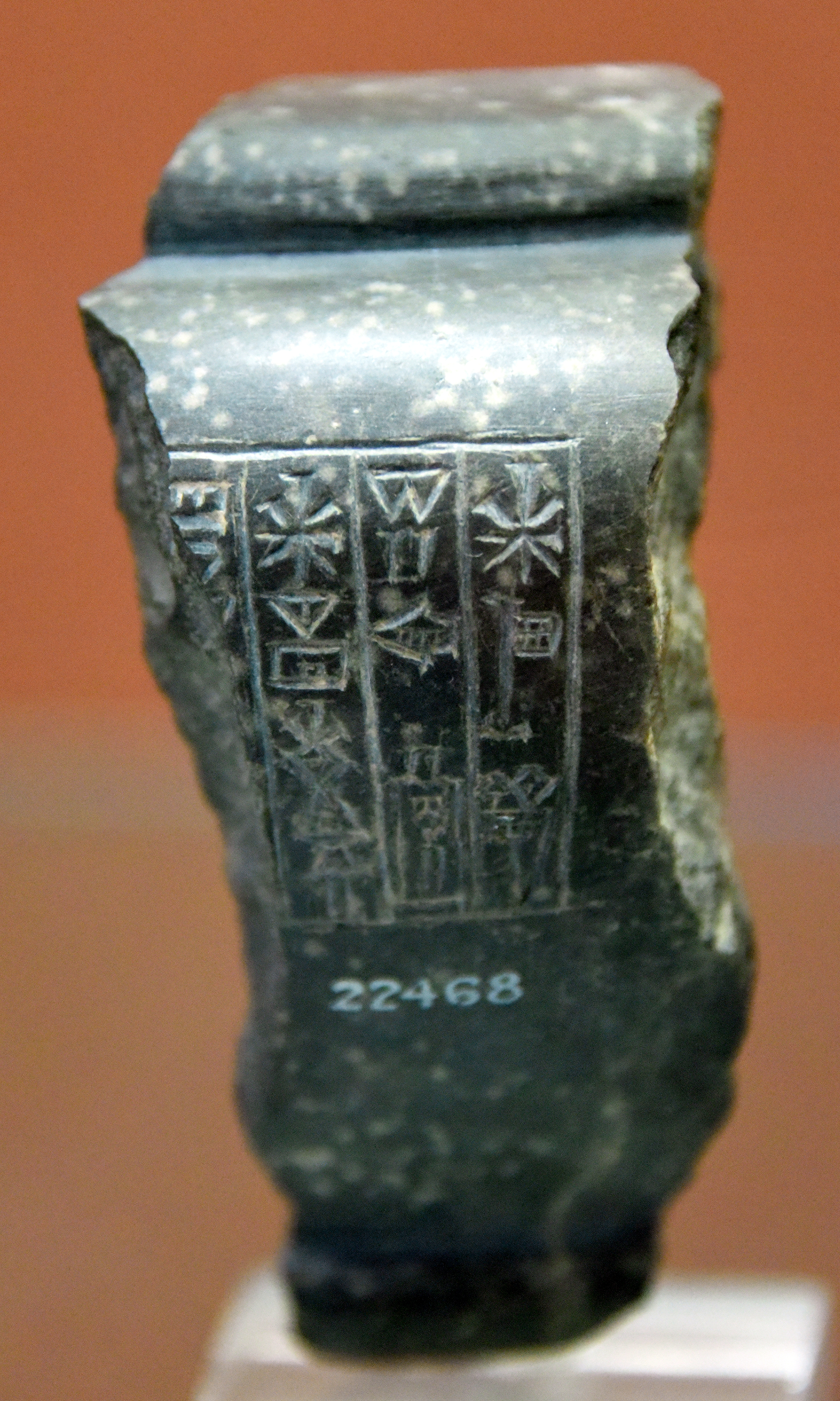
- A votive object ibscribed with Gudea's dedication to Igalim. Found in Telloh, presently in the collection of the British Museum.
- Major cult center: Girsu

Genealogy
- Parents: Ningirsu and Bau
- Siblings: Shulshaga

Igalim (Sumerian: 𒀭𒅅𒄋) or Igalimma (Sumerian: 𒀭𒅅𒄋𒈠) was a Mesopotamian god from the local pantheon of the state of Lagash. He was closely associated with Ningirsu, possibly originating as the personification of the door of his temple, and was regarded as a member of his family. His older brother was Shulshaga and his mother was Bau, as already attested in Early Dynastic sources. Until the end of the Ur III period he was worshiped in Lagash and Girsu, where he had a temple, though he also appears in a number of later texts.

== Name and character ==
The consensus view is that Igalima's name can be translated as "door of the bison". He functioned as the divine gatekeeper of the E-ninnu, "house of fifty" (also known as E-ninnu-Anzû-babbar, "house of fifty white Anzû birds"), the temple of Ningirsu in Girsu. It has been proposed that he was originally the personification of its gate, and the cuneiform sign alim ("bison") in his name metaphorically referred to Ningirsu, rather than to a real animal. An inscription of Gudea refers to Igalim as a divine "high bailiff" (gal_{5}-lá-gal). It is presumed this was his primary role.

Igalim's name should not be confused with the similar theonym Iglulim, which is not a genitive construction and refers to a different deity.

The iconography of Igalim is not known, as while it has been proposed that depictions of a bull carrying a winged gate on its back are his symbol, this view found no universal support due to lack of examples from the area he was worshiped in.

== Associations with other deities ==
Ningirsu was regarded as Igalim's father, while Shulshaga, described as the eldest son of this god, as his older brother. Ningirsu's wife, Bau, was regarded as the mother of the two brothers. These four deities were presumed to have already formed a family in the Early Dynastic period. In the majority of texts from Lagash Igalim appears after Shulshaga if both of them are invoked at once, which presumably reflects his junior status. However, Grégoire Nicolet points out that in later god lists Igalima appears first instead, which he attributes to his greater importance in the eyes of their compilers, resulting from his connection to the temple E-ninnu.

Due to the well attested analogy between Ningirsu and Ninurta, Igalim appears in association with the latter in the composition Ninurta D. A text from Kish, BM 33055, refers to Igalim and Shulshaga as the weapons of Zababa, while on the tablet STT 400 they are grouped with the deified weapons of Ninazu, Šulazida ("hero of the right hand") and Šulagubbu ("hero of the right hand").

In a hymn to Nungal, Igalim is attested as a member of the court of this goddess, specifically as her "high warden" (nu-bànda-maḫ). This association might be linked to the role assigned to him in the inscription of Gudea.

== Worship ==
Igalim belonged to the pantheon of Lagash. He is already attested in sources contemporary with the early texts from Fara. The oldest dedicatory inscription mentioning him comes from the reign of Uru'inimgina and commemorates the construction of his temple Emeḫušgalanki, "house which holds the terrible me of heaven and earth". The same temple is also mentioned in an inscription of Gudea. It was located in Girsu. According to Tonia Sharlach, the temples of Igalim and Shulshaga in the state of Lagash in the Early Dynastic period, as well as their various dependencies (such as fields or fisheries) were maintained by the sons of the reigning monarch or, if they were too young to fulfill this role, by their mother. Igalim's clergy is attested in textual sources under the generic term "people of Igalim" (lú ^{d}Ig-alim), analogous to these used to refer to groups connected to Bau and Shulshaga. Igalim is attested in various Early Dynastic offering lists from Lagash focused on the deities from the circle of Ningirsu and Bau, for example as a recipient of sheep or goats, in some cases alongside Shulshaga. He was celebrated during the festival of his mother in Girsu (alongside deities such as Ninshubur, Ninazu or Ḫegir) and during another, focused on his father, which might have taken place in the city of Lagash.

A statuette dedicated by Shulgi to Igalim has been found in Telloh (Girsu). He refers to him as the "beloved son of Ningirsu" in the accompanying inscription. It is the only identified royal inscription from the Ur III period dedicated to this god.

Active worship of Igalim is only attested until the end of the Ur III period. In the later Old Babylonian Nippur god list he appears as the 77th of the deities enumerated, before Nergal and in the proximity of other underworld deities, which according to Jeremiah Peterson might be a reflection of his association with Nungal. In the Canonical Temple List, most likely composed in the Kassite period, his temple Emeḫušgalanki occurs as the 498th entry.
