= Urnunta-ea =

Mesopotamian goddess

- Goddess of rain clouds
- Other names: Burnunta-ea
- Major cult center: Girsu

Genealogy
- Parents: Ningirsu (father); Bau (mother)
- Siblings: Zazaru, Nipa’e, Ḫegirnuna, Ḫesaga, Zurmu, Zarmu

Urnunta-ea was a Mesopotamian goddess originally worshiped in Girsu as one of the daughters of Ningirsu and Bau. She might have been associated with rain clouds. She is known from an Early Dynastic inscription of Urukagina, from texts from the reign of the Second Dynasty of Lagash, and from the god list An = Anum. In the last of these sources she appears in the circle of deities associated with Lisin, rather than Bau or Ningirsu.

== Name ==
The theonym Urnunta-ea can be translated from Sumerian as "who comes out of the lap of the prince" (implicitly: Ningirsu). It was written in cuneiform as ^{d}úr-nun-ta-è-a. It is sometimes romanized as Urnunta'ea or Urnuntaea. A variant spelling, ^{d}úr-é-nun-ta-è-a, is known from the Gudea cylinders. Thorkild Jacobsen and Dietz Otto Edzard suggested reading it as Uragrunta-ea. However, according to Manfred Krebernik this is erroneous. A further variant known from a fragment of an Old Babylonian litany from Kish describing the pantheon of Kesh or Adab, as well as from a single Neo-Babylonian (or later) copy of the god list An = Anum, ^{d}bur-nun-ta-è-a, reflects the reinterpretation of the name as "she [came forth] from the Euphrates". Structurally similar theonyms include Meslamta-ea, Šaturnunta'e and Nu-E_{2}.NUN-ta-e. (Note: "The light coming forth from the cella", a deity only attested in the Abu Salabikh god list and in the forty-ninth of the Zame Hymns, possibly syncretized with Nuska after the Early Dynastic period.)

== Associations with other deities ==
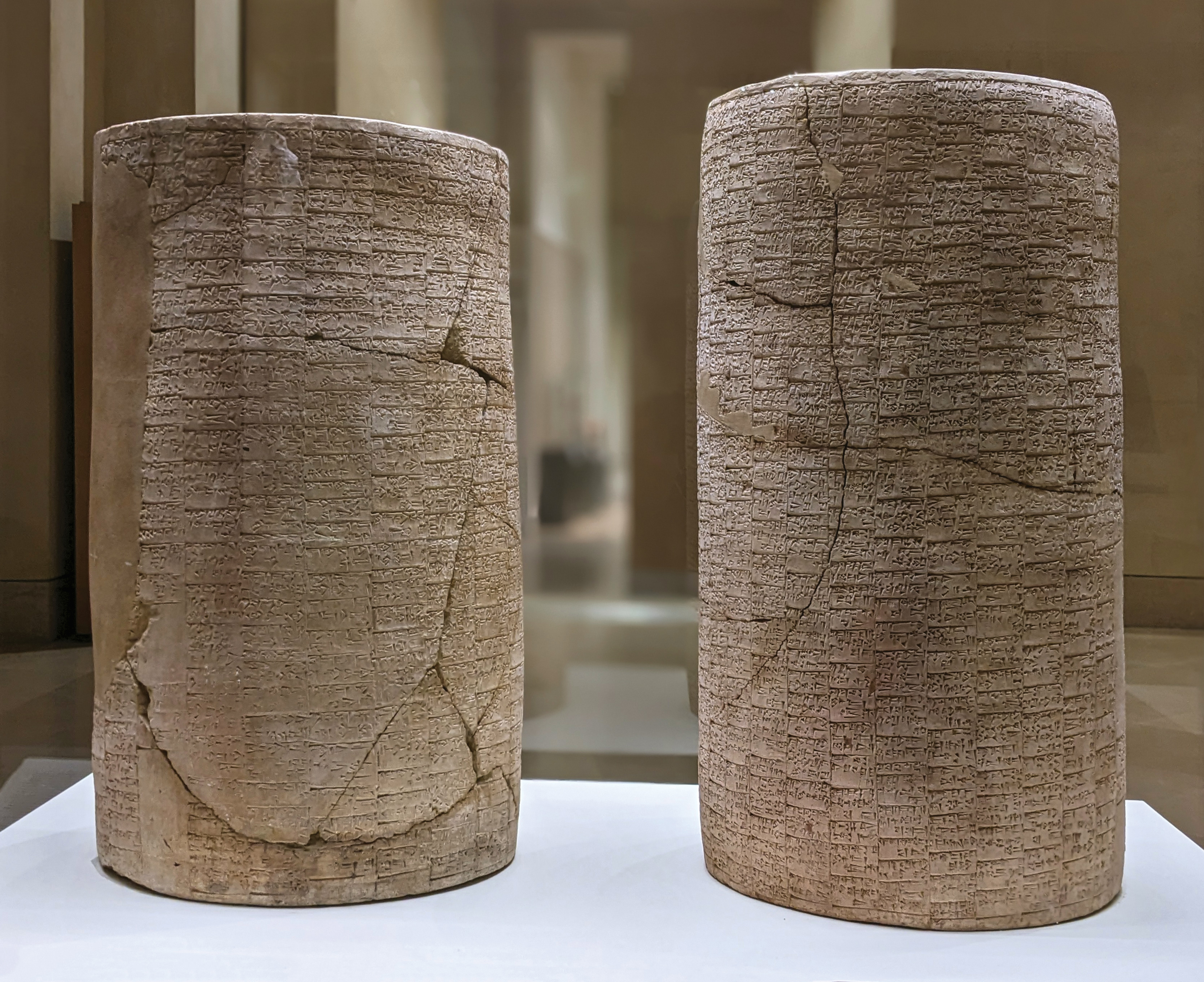
The Gudea cylinders (Louvre).

As early as during the reign of Urukagina, Urnunta-ea was regarded as a child of Bau and Ningirsu. In the composition preserved on the Gudea cylinders, she and Zazaru, Nipa'e, Ḫegirnuna, Ḫesaga, Zurmu and Zarmu are jointly addressed as daughters and "unruly children" of Bau and Ningirsu and as the lukur (high-ranking female attendants) of the latter. Based on the description of the members of this group as a source of abundance, Jacobsen proposed that they represented the rain clouds. Gebhard J. Selz notes that Ḫegirnuna seemingly was originally an independent deity of greater importance than the other six, and on this basis assumes that initially only Urnunta-ea, Zazaru and Nipa'e, who also occur together in an earlier inscription, formed a group defined by their shared status as daughters of Bau.

In An = Anum, Urnunta-ea instead occurs among the children of Lisin (tablet II, line 77). According to Ryan D. Winters this most likely reflects a degree of overlap or interchange between the circles of deities associated with Bau and these belonging to the local pantheon of Kesh, one of Lisin's cult centers.

== Worship ==
Urnunta-ea was worshiped in Girsu. The first known reference has been identified in an Early Dynastic inscription of Urukagina of Lagash. It deals with his building activities in Girsu, as well as Tiraš and Antasur, presumed to be settlements in its immediate proximity. It mentions the construction of chapels dedicated to Urnunta-ea, Nipa'e and Zazaru in a new temple of Lammašaga. Fragments of this text have been identified on a clay cone and jars found in Girsu. No other attestations of Urnunta-ea are available from the Early Dynastic period.

An unprovenanced inscription of one of the two rulers from the Second Dynasty of Lagash bearing the name Ur-Ningirsu, most likely Ur-Ningirsu I, (Note: This assumption relies on a reference to the appointment of a new šita-abba priest of Nin-MAR.KI, an event attested in one of Ur-Ningirsu I's year formulas; existence of two rulers bearing this name is confirmed by the offering list BM 18474, which mentions "Ur-Ningirsu the elder" (Ur-Ningirsu gula), or Ur-Ningirsu I, and "Ur-Ningirsu son of Gudea" (Ur-Ningirsu dumu Gudea) or Ur-Ningirsu II, as well as by the Lagash King List, an Old Babylonian literary text.) commemorates the construction of a house of worship for Urnunta-ea. (Note: Dietz Otto Edzard assumed the deity invoked is male, but Gebhard J. Selz, Manfred Krebernik and Ryan D. Winters all refer to Urnunta-ea as a goddess.) It was located in Girsu, and most likely was a chapel in the temple of Lammašaga, in this case identified as a title of Ninsun rather than a distinct goddess.

The composition preserved on the Gudea cylinders, a hymn commemorating the reconstruction of Ningirsu's temple Eninnu, also mentions Urnunta-ea. She is described praying on behalf of Gudea alongside six other goddesses also regarded as daughters of Bau and Ningirsu.
