= Meme (Mesopotamian goddess) =

Mesopotamian goddess

- Divine caregiver
- Other names: Memešaga
- Major cult center: Rakima

Meme or Memešaga was a Mesopotamian goddess possibly regarded as a divine caretaker. While originally fully separate, she eventually came to be treated as one and the same as Gula, and as such came to be associated with medicine. The god list An = Anum additionally indicates she served as the sukkal (attendant deity) of Ningal.

== Name and character ==
The theonym written in cuneiform as ^{d}ME.ME likely can be read phonetically, though according to Manfred Krebernik a degree of caution is necessary. The meaning of this name is uncertain, though it is commonly suggested that it might be an example of a so-called "baby word" (Lallwort) which referred to a mother or more generically to a female caretaker. A lexical text from Ebla explains it as u_{3}-me-tum, possibly to be understood as a Loanword originating in Sumerian, "nursemaid". Based on these lexical factors it has been proposed that Meme was regarded as a divine caregiver.

The original full name of the goddess was likely Memešaga, though in the god list An = Anum Meme and Memešaga have separate entries, with the latter occurring right after the former in the Ninkarrak section. Irene Sibbing-Plantholt points out that the addition of the element šaga ("good") to a theonym would find a direct parallel in the name of the goddess Lammašaga.

It is assumed that even though Meme eventually came to exist only as an alternate name of other goddesses, she was initially a fully independent deity.

== Associations with other deities ==
Meme was one of Mesopotamian goddesses associated with healing who formed an interconnected network through either shared aspects of their respective character or overlapping circles of associated deities. The other goddesses belonging to it were Gula, Ninisina, Ninkarrak, Nintinugga and Bau. However, Irene Sibbing-Plantholt points out that what sets her apart from the other members of this group is the fact that she never appears in the context of medicine and healing on her own, only through association with Gula. It is uncertain how did the connection between these two goddesses originally develop, but eventually Meme came to be fully absorbed by Gula, and her name became an alternate writing of the latter theonym. The oldest possible evidence of this process comes from an Old Babylonian lexical list. In a number of later Sumero-Akkadian bilingual texts, Meme occurs in place of Gula in the Sumerian version, though this pattern is not consistent, and the latter could also be "translated" as Nintinugga or even Damu.

In the god list An = Anum, the theonym Meme appears both in the Išḫara and Ninkarrak sections. Sibbing-Plantholt notes that these two goddesses formed a pair in other sources. Further lexical lists also appear to associate Meme with Ninmug and Nisaba.

A deity named Meme, written ^{d}ME^{kà-kà}ME, served as the sukkal (divine attendant) of Ningal, the wife of the moon god Nanna, according to An = Anum. Richard L. Litke argues the glosses are unlikely to refer to an otherwise entirely unattested reading of the sign ME, and on this basis proposes that in another version of the list the deity Kakka, elsewhere in the same text equated with Ninkarrak, occupied Meme's position in the court of Ningal. In this case Kakka would presumably be female, and Litke considered her to be distinct from the male messenger god bearing the same name.

== Worship ==
The fact that the toponym Rakima or Rakimu is explained in two separate sources as URU.KI.ÁG.^{d}ME.ME, "the beloved city of Meme," as well as the references to a temple of Meme, are assumed to indicate that in the Early Dynastic (or possibly Old Akkadian) period she was actively worshiped and had her own cult center. She is attested in a number of theophoric names from the third millennium BCE, including Ur-Meme and Ir-Meme. She is also mentioned in the text known as Elegy for the death of Nawritum, where the husband of the eponymous woman searches for this goddess and a Lamma deity while mourning.

Memešaga, presumed to be the same deity, was worshiped in Nippur in the Ur III period, and received offerings during the gusisu festival of Ninurta, though her importance in the religious life of this city was minor.

The worship of Meme as an individual deity ended after the Old Babylonian period, and her cult fully merged with that of Gula, in contrast with these of Bau, Ninisina, Nintinugga and Ninkarrak, which did continue to be regarded as distinct in a limited scope. Her name remained in use, though it simply designated Gula. One example of an inscription using it in such a context has been identified on a Neo-Babylonian jar stopper which mentions her alongside Marduk, Nintinugga and Ninsina. A dog figure from Sippar inscribed with Meme's name is also presumed to indicate identification with Gula, as the latter commonly received similar votive objects.
