= Lammašaga =

Mesopotamian goddess

- Sukkal of Bau
- Major cult center: Girsu, Lagash

Lammašaga was a Mesopotamian goddess who functioned as the sukkal (divine attendant) of Bau. She belonged to a class of protective deities known as Lamma. She was originally worshiped in Lagash and Girsu, though attestations are also available from other cities. A hymn focused on her was copied in scribal schools in the Old Babylonian period.

== Name and character ==
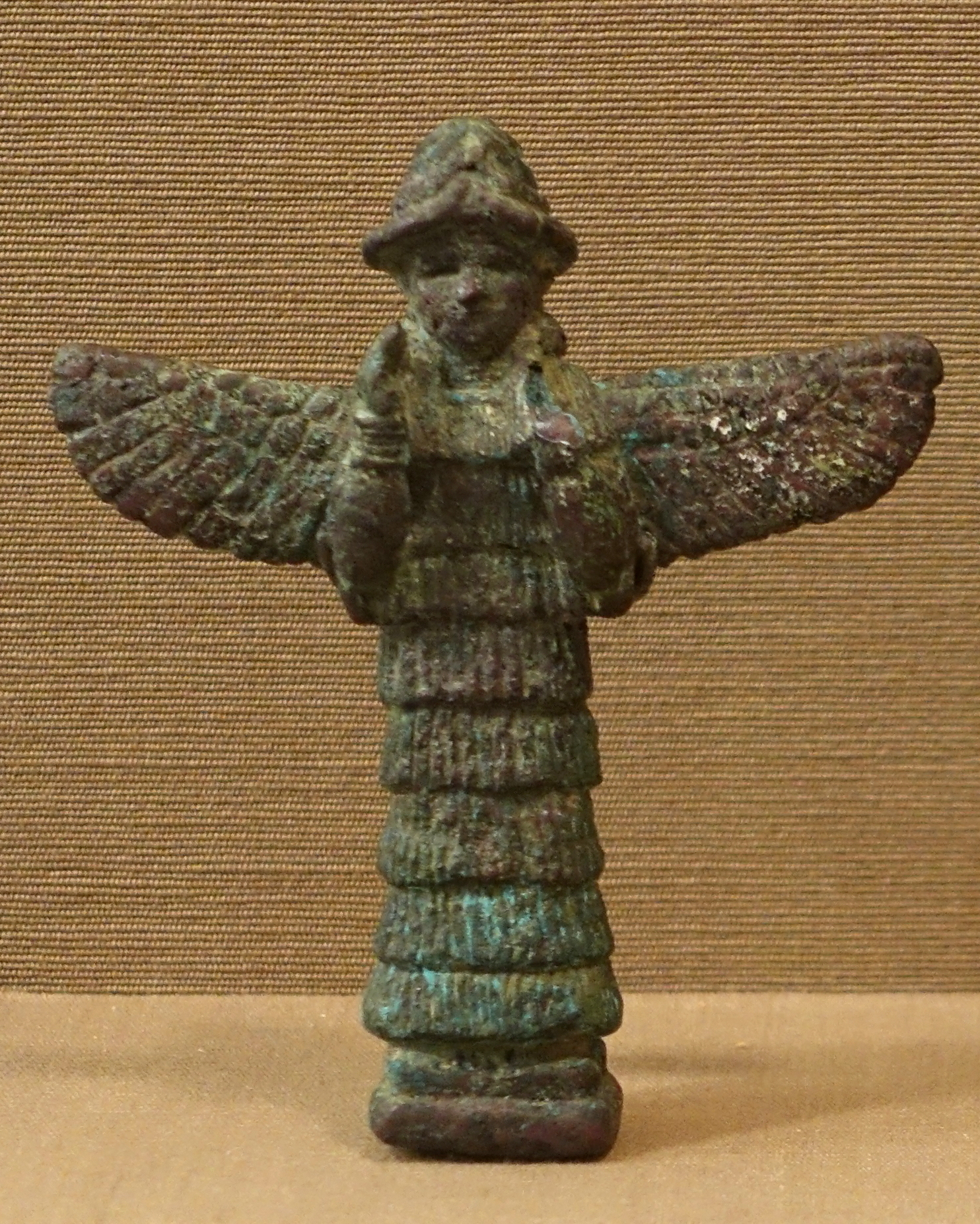
Figure of a Lamma deity from the Isin-Larsa period. Oriental Institute Museum, Chicago.

The name Lammašaga can be translated as "the good protective spirit" or "the good Lamma," with the element Lamma referring to a type of female protective deity. The name Lamma itself sometimes could be used to refer to the specific goddess too. Irene Sibbing-Plantholt notes that the addition of the element šaga to a theonym also finds a parallel in Memešaga, a variant form of the name of the goddess Meme.

Lammašaga functioned as the divine attendant (sukkal) of Bau. She was believed to intercede between her and worshipers. Her role might be reflected by the personal name Lamma-sukkal. The association between her and Bau is well attested, and dates to the early periods of recorded Mesopotamian history. Other deities could also be believed to possess Lamma of their own, for example a hymn to Nanshe mentions that hers was named ^{d}DUMU.TUR-šugi. The name Lammašaga was also applied to the personal Lamma of the deified king Lugalbanda, who according to Åke W. Sjöberg should be considered distinct from the goddess under discussion. Bau's Lamma could also be referred to as the "Lamma of the Tarsirsir," a temple of the former deity located in Girsu, as attested for example in an inscription of a bowl from the reign of king Ur-Bau. A reference to the "Lamma of the Tarsirsir" also occurs in an inscription of Nammahani. Attempts were made to prove that the theonym Lammašaga might have referred to a manifestation of Bau rather than an independent deity, though Christopher Metcalf in a recent publication notes that while the evidence "may sometimes seem ambiguous, and practices may have varied in different periods," there is nonetheless sufficient proof in the belief in Lammašaga as a distinct deity.

An astronomical text states that ^{mul}Lam-mu, the star Lamma, corresponded to the sukkal of Bau, to be identified with Lammašaga. The same astral body was associated with Urmašum, the sukkal of Gula, as well. The star is most likely to be identified as Vega.

== Worship ==
The oldest attestations of Lammašaga come from Early Dynastic texts from Lagash (Al-Hiba) and Girsu (Tello). Uru'inimgina built a temple dedicated to her which also housed shrines for the deities Zazaru, Nipae and Urnunta-ea. She is also mentioned in an early riddle, which states that she was the city goddess of a place whose name is not preserved, in which a canal named Lamma-igi-bar was located. This text, dated to the twenty fourth century BCE, is the oldest known reference to the concept of Lamma in the entire known corpus of cuneiform texts from Mesopotamia, and it might indicate that it originated in the territory of Lagash, and only spread from there to other regions.

Ur-Ningirsu I's wife dedicated a human-headed bull figure to the "Lamma-goddess of Bau" in the Ebabbar temple in Larsa. Ur-Ningirsu I himself built a temple dedicated to Lammašaga in Girsu, though his inscriptions state that the deity meant was Ninsun. However, there is no indication that Lammašaga, treated as an independent deity, was the same goddess as Ninsun. According to Claus Wilcke, when designating Ninsun, Lammašaga functioned only as an epithet.

An inscription of Samsu-iluna mentions that he returned Lammašaga to the temple Ebabbar in Sippar, dedicated to Shamash and Aya. A reference to Lammašaga as a goddess belonging to the pantheon of Nippur is known too, and in one document she occurs between the local deities Erragal and Ninimma.

== Literature ==
The hymn Bau A, despite its title used in modern literature, is focused on Lammašaga, and might have originated in Girsu. Despite the decline of Lagash as a state, it was a part of the scribal school curriculum in the Old Babylonian period, and it seemingly had a wide circulation. It is considered difficult to translate due to the presence of many terms otherwise entirely absent from similar compositions written in Sumerian, though common in lexical lists. According to Christopher Metcalf, the hymn is a description of a statue. It might have been composed for a ceremony during which it was induced into a temple. This conclusion has also been tentatively accepted by Jeremiah Peterson, though he notes that a degree of caution is necessary, as there is an overlap between terms used to describe living beings and statues in Mesopotamian literature. The text refers to Lammašaga as the "sun goddess of the land"; this epithet does not indicate that her character was solar, but rather that she was understood as benign and held a special status in the eyes of her worshipers. It also states that she was responsible for bringing the "tablet of life" from heaven to earth. This artifact, distinct from the tablet of destiny though according to Janice Barrabee directly related to it, is elsewhere associated with other deities, including Ninimma, Nungal, Ḫaya and Nisaba, and it was believed that gods used it to write down the righteous deeds of humans. After detailing Lammašaga's role in the court of Bau, the composition moves on to describing her appearance in three separate sections, focused respectively on her head, nape, forehead, lips, ears, and jaws; skin, neck, sides, limbs, and fingers; navel, hips, and pudenda. Peterson notes that at least some passages can be classified as erotic poetry. While a king is mentioned as well, and presumably he is a supplicant on whose behalf Lammašaga intercedes with Bau, he is not identified by name in the surviving fragments, which makes it impossible to precisely date its composition.

A possible reference to Lammašaga can also be found in the Lament for Ur, which states that the "Lamma of the Etarsirsir" has abandoned it. Other references to Lamma deities abandoning their posts are known, for example according to the Lament for Uruk, "[the city’s] lama ran away; its lama (said) ‘hide in the steppe!’; [it] took unfamiliar paths."
