= Baranamtarra =

Queen of Lagash

Bara-irnun
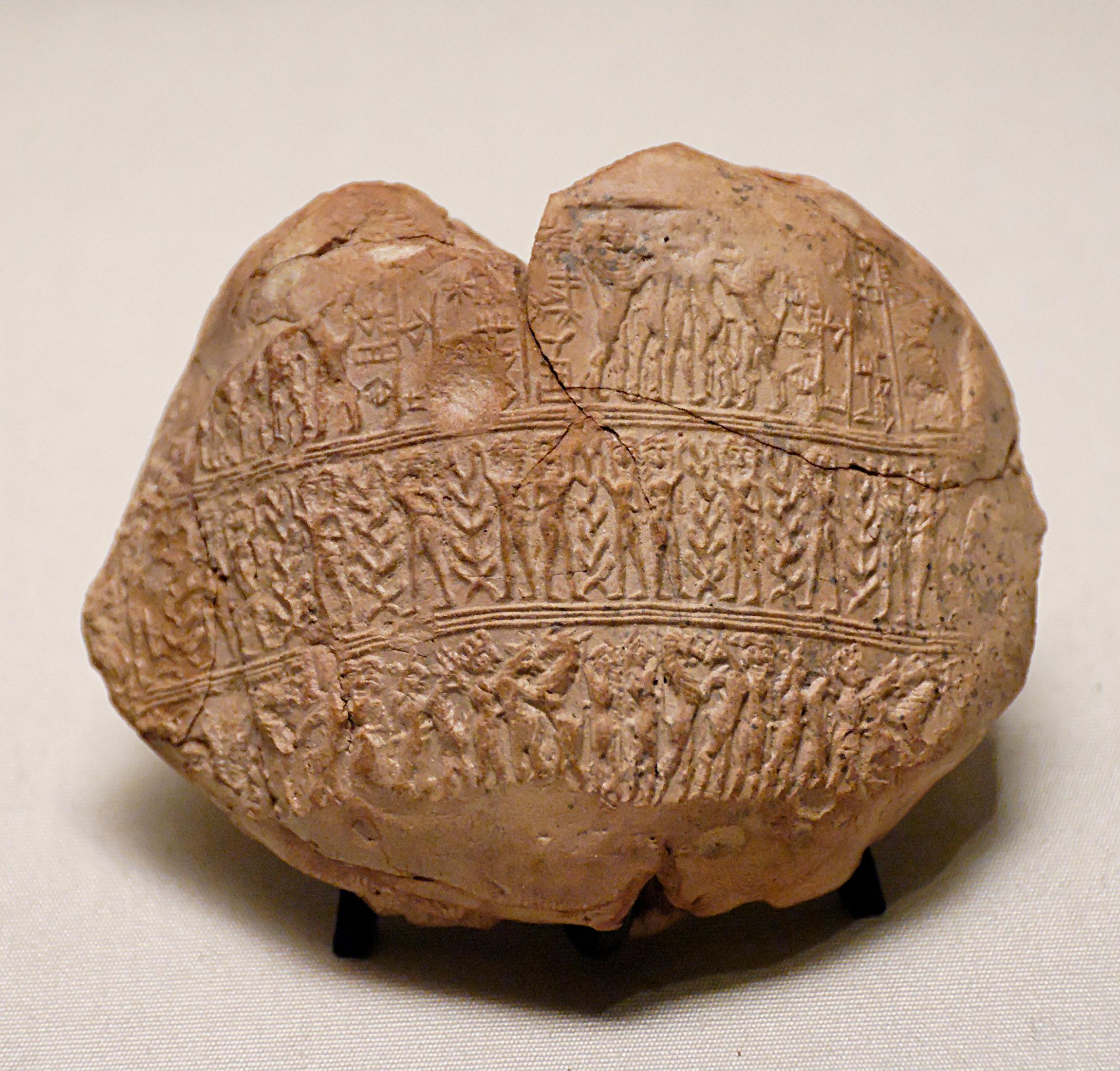
- Seal of Baranamtarra, c. 2400 BC, Girsu/Tello, Louvre Museum

Queen consort of Lagash
- Reign: c. 2384 - c. 2378 BC
- King: Lugalanda
- Died: c. 2375 BC
- Spouse: Lugalanda

Baranamtarra (died c. 2375 BC) was the Queen consort of Lagash.

Around 2384 BC, Baranamtarra and her husband, Lugalanda, seized power in Lagash, one of the oldest cities in Sumer. They became the largest landholders in the city, and Baranamtarra presided over a temple and several estates herself. She was daughter of Ashag, and exchanged presents with Ninigidubti, wife of the en of Adab. Queen Baranamtarra managed her own private estates and those of the temple of the goddess Bau. She bought and sold slaves and sent diplomatic missions to neighboring states.

Records that still exist today reflect the private business activities of the royal wife during Lagash’s great age of international trade and prosperity. Baranamtara sent woolen clothes and silver to Dilmun and sold copper imported from Dilmun in the neighboring city of Umma. In keeping with the standard practices of international merchants, she dedicated a bronze statue to the goddess Nanshe. For her estates, which marketed milk products, Baranamtara purchased cattle in Elam. The expression “property of Baranamtara” is found on lists of people, animals, estates, and various objects.

Due to the political instability at the time, they in turn were overthrown by another ruler, Urukagina, around 2378 BC.
