= E-sara =

Temple in Uruk dedicated to Inanna

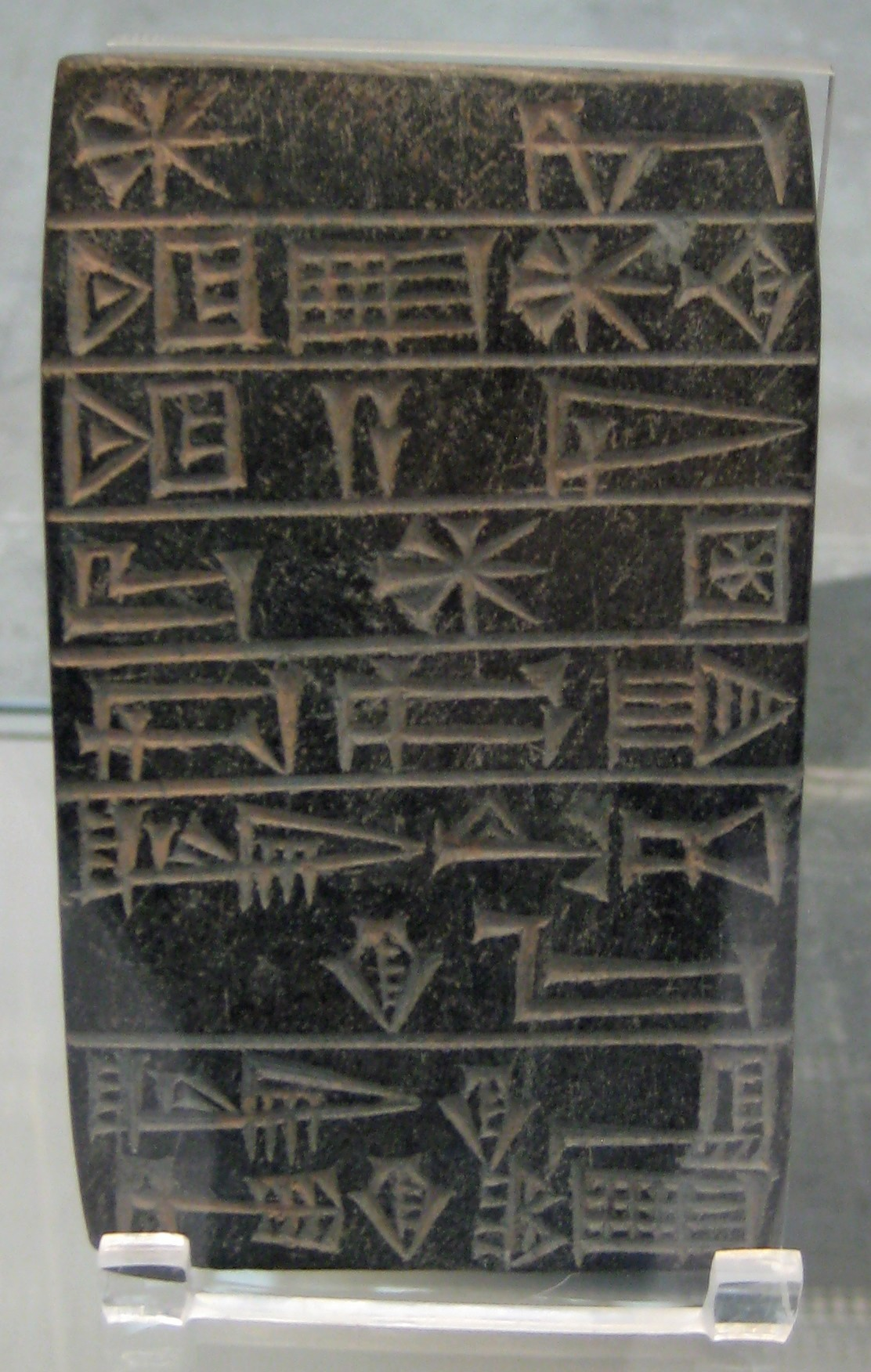
Foundation tablet from the Temple of Inanna at Uruk, dating to the reign of Ur-Nammu.

E-sara (Cuneiform: E_{2} SAR.A 𒂍𒊬𒀀 "House of the Universe"), was the temple dedicated to Inanna in Uruk by Ur-Nammu (reigned c. 2112 BC – 2094 BC).

In the Enuma Elish, E-sara was created by Marduk at the end of Tablet IV, as he divided Tiamat into two halves, and created a "House of Heaven", for Anu, Bel, and Ea.
