= Shulshaga =

Mesopotamian god

Shulshaga (Šulšaga) or Shulsagana (Šulšagana) was a Mesopotamian god. He was a part of the state pantheon of the city-state of Lagash. His name means "youth of his heart" in Sumerian, with the possessive pronoun possibly referring to Shulshaga's father, Ningirsu.

While direct references to the lineage of deities are rare in sources from the Early Dynastic period, it is certain that Shulshaga was viewed as the eldest son of Ningirsu and his wife Bau, and as the older brother of Igalim. One inscription refers to Shulshaga and Igalim as "beloved children of Ningirsu." They received an equal amount of offerings according to documents from Early Dynastic Lagash.

Several rulers of Lagash were devoted to Shulshaga. Ur-Nanshe built a statue of him. Urukagina mentions building temples to multiple deities of Lagash, including Shulsaga, as well as his parents, brother, as well as Hegir, Bau's Lamma and Ninmu. Said temple bore the name (E-)tuš-akkil-li. One inscription of Gudea mentions him alongside Ningirsu and the king's tutelary god Ningishzida, and credits him with providing him with the "breath of life."

It is possible that in later periods Shulshaga was worshiped in Assur in Esharra, the temple of Ashur. Late lexical texts also sometimes apply the names Shulshaga and Igalim to the weapons of Zababa.

== Bibliography ==
- George, Andrew R. (1993). House most high: the temples of ancient Mesopotamia. Winona Lake: Eisenbrauns. ISBN 0-931464-80-3. OCLC 27813103.
- Kobayashi, Toshiko (1984). "ON THE MEANING OF THE OFFERINGS FOR THE STATUE OF ENTEMENA". Orient. 20. The Society for Near Eastern Studies in Japan: 43–65. doi:10.5356/orient1960.20.43. ISSN 1884-1392.
- Kobayashi, Toshiko (1992). "ON NINAZU, AS SEEN IN THE ECONOMIC TEXTS OF THE EARLY DYNASTIC LAGAŠ". Orient. 28. The Society for Near Eastern Studies in Japan: 75–105. doi:10.5356/orient1960.28.75. ISSN 1884-1392.
- Krebernik, Manfred (2013), "Šulšaga(na/i)", Reallexikon der Assyriologie
- Vacín, Luděk (2011). "Gudea and Ninĝišzida: A Ruler and His God". U_{4} du_{11}-ga-ni sá mu-ni-ib-du_{11}: ancient Near Eastern studies in memory of Blahoslav Hruška. Dresden: Islet. ISBN 978-3-9808466-6-0. OCLC 761844864.
