= Bau (goddess) =

Mesopotamian goddess

- Tutelary goddess of Girsu
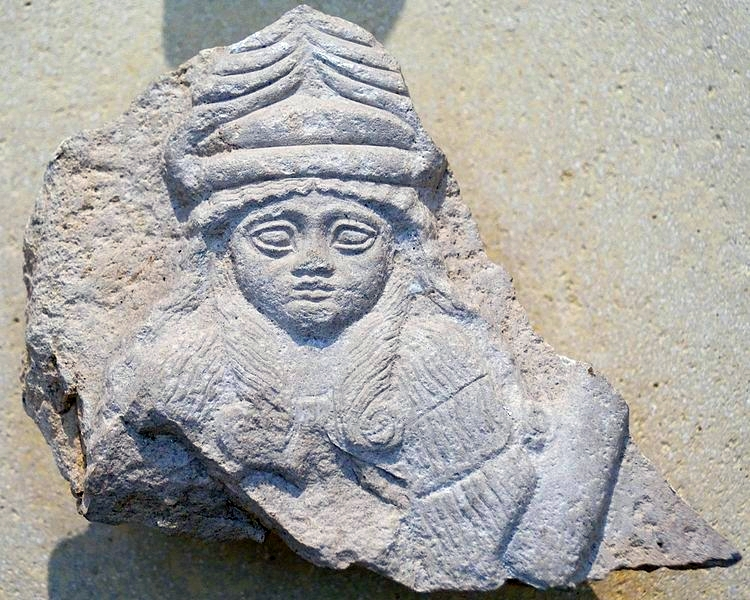
- Bust of a goddess, perhaps Bau, from Girsu. Louvre Museum.
- Major cult center: Girsu, Lagash, later Kish
- Symbol: waterfowl, scorpion

Genealogy
- Parents: Anu (father); Gatumdug (in the third millennium BCE); Abau/Ababa (in An = Anum) (mother)
- Spouse: Ningirsu (in Lagash); Zababa (in Kish)
- Children: Igalim and Shulshaga; seven daughters (including Ḫegir, Urnunta-ea, Zurmu and Zarmu)

Bau (cuneiform: 𒀭𒁀𒌑 ^{d}Ba-U_{2}; also romanized as Baba or Babu) is a Mesopotamian goddess. The reading of her name is a subject of debate among researchers, though Bau is considered the conventional spelling today. While initially regarded simply as a life-giving deity, in some cases associated with the creation of mankind, over the course of the third and second millennia BCE she also acquired the role of a healing goddess. She could be described as a divine midwife.

In sources from Lagash and Girsu, Bau's husband was the god Ningirsu. Among their children were deities such as Igalim, Shulshaga and Ḫegir. While they could still be regarded as a couple in later sources, from the Old Babylonian period onwards Bau was also viewed as the wife of Zababa, the tutelary god of Kish. Another deity associated with her was her attendant goddess Lammašaga. Most likely for political reasons, Bau also came to be associated, and partially syncretised, with the medicine goddess Ninisina. In the late second millennium BCE she also came to be associated with Gula, and could be equated with her, though texts where they are two separate goddesses are known too. In one case, Bau is described as the deity who bestowed Gula's position upon her.

The earliest evidence indicates that Bau's initial cult center was Girsu, and that early on she also came to be worshipped in Lagash. Multiple kings of this city left behind inscriptions which mention her, and some of them, for example Uru'inimgina, referred to her as their divine mother. She is also attested in the theophoric names of many ordinary people. While the area where she was initially worshipped declined in the Old Babylonian period, she was transferred to Kish, and continued to be venerated there as late as in the Neo-Babylonian period. She is also attested in texts from Uruk dating to the Seleucid period.

== Name ==
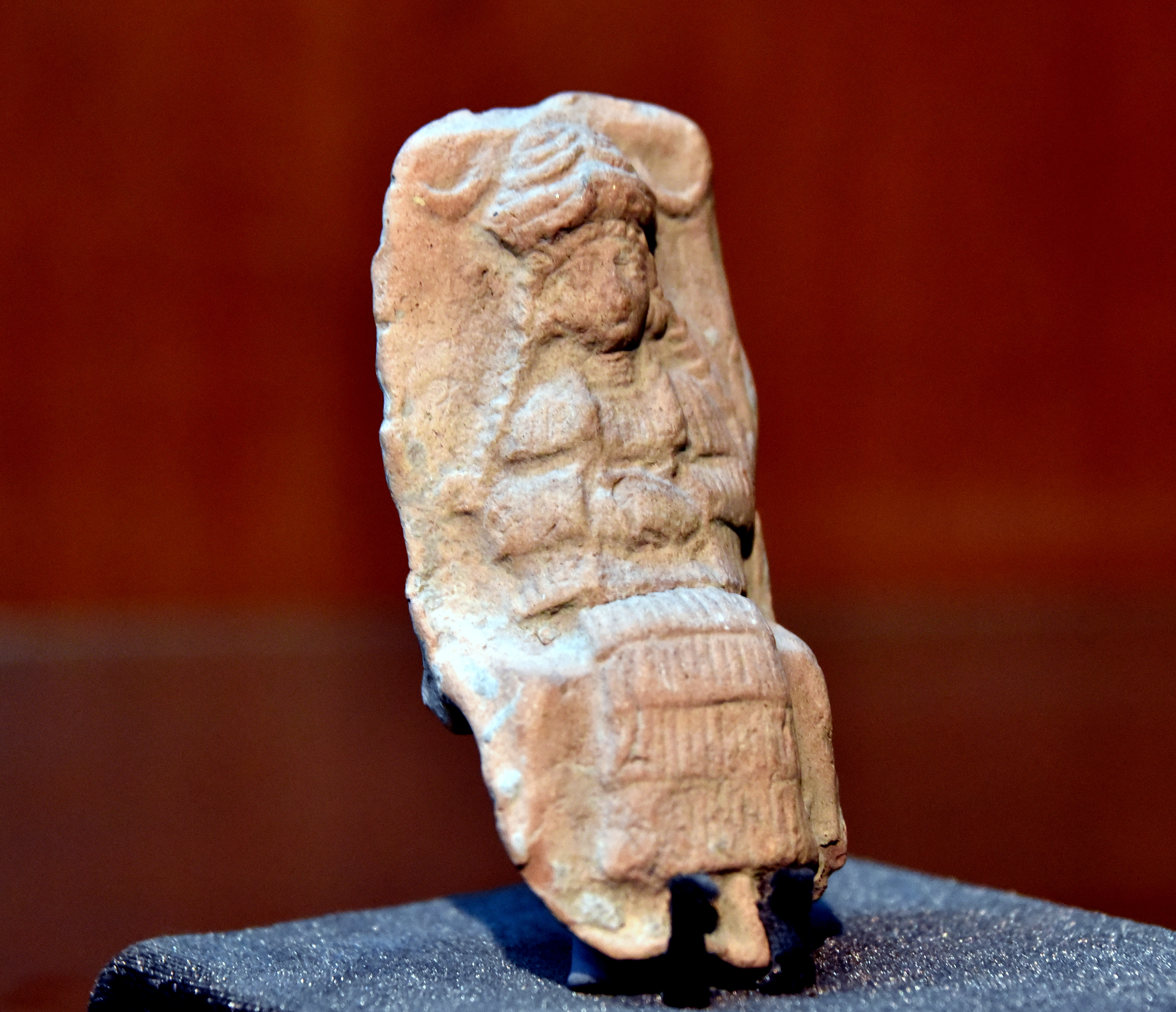
Mesopotamian female deity seated on a chair, probably Bau or Ishtar. Old-Babylonian fired clay plaque from Ur, Iraq, 2003-1595 BCE. Sulaymaniyah Museum, Iraq

Bau is considered the conventional romanization today. However, it has been historically been a subject of debate in Assyriology, and various other possibilities have been proposed, including Baba, Bawu and Babu. Due to the uncertainties surrounding the reading of the name, some experts favor romanizing it as BaU or Ba-U_{2}, including Manuel Ceccarelli, Jeremiah Peterson, Julia M. Asher-Greve and Joan Goodnick Westenholz. While "Baba" is a common romanization in publications from the twentieth century, the evidence both in favor and against it is inconclusive. Edmond Sollberger considered "Bawa" to be the original form of the name, with "Baba" being a latter pronunciation, similar to the shift from Huwawa to Humbaba. Maurice Lambert assumed Baba was the Akkadian reading and argued that in scholarship it should be only employed in discussion of Akkadian sources. Giovani Marchesi notes that it is not certain if the phonetic spelling "Baba" found in a few Old Akkadian texts corresponds to this goddess or another deity, though he remarks it does seem that "Baba" and "Bau" were interchangeable in the writing of theophoric names, for example in the case of the legendary queen Kubaba/Ku-Bau. He concludes that Bau was most likely the original pronunciation at the time when the orthography of the name was standardized in the third millennium BCE. Gonzalo Rubio disagrees with Marchesi's conclusions and argues that the reading Baba would match the structure of a number of other names of Mesopotamian deities with no clear Sumerian or Semitic etymologies, such as Alala, Bunene or Zababa. However, Ryan D. Winters states that the fact the name was written phonetically and not logographically, with two different symbols, makes it implausible it was originally pronounced as Baba, a reduplication of a single syllable. Christopher Metcalf notes that the reading "Bau" is also supported by the attestations of the dative form ^{d}Ba-U_{2}-ur_{2}.

The meaning of Bau's name is unknown. Thorkild Jacobsen's proposal that it was "an imitation of dog's bark, as English 'bowwow'" is regarded as erroneous today, as unlike other healing goddesses (Gula, Ninisina, Nintinugga and Ninkarrak) Bau was not associated with dogs.

== Character and iconography ==
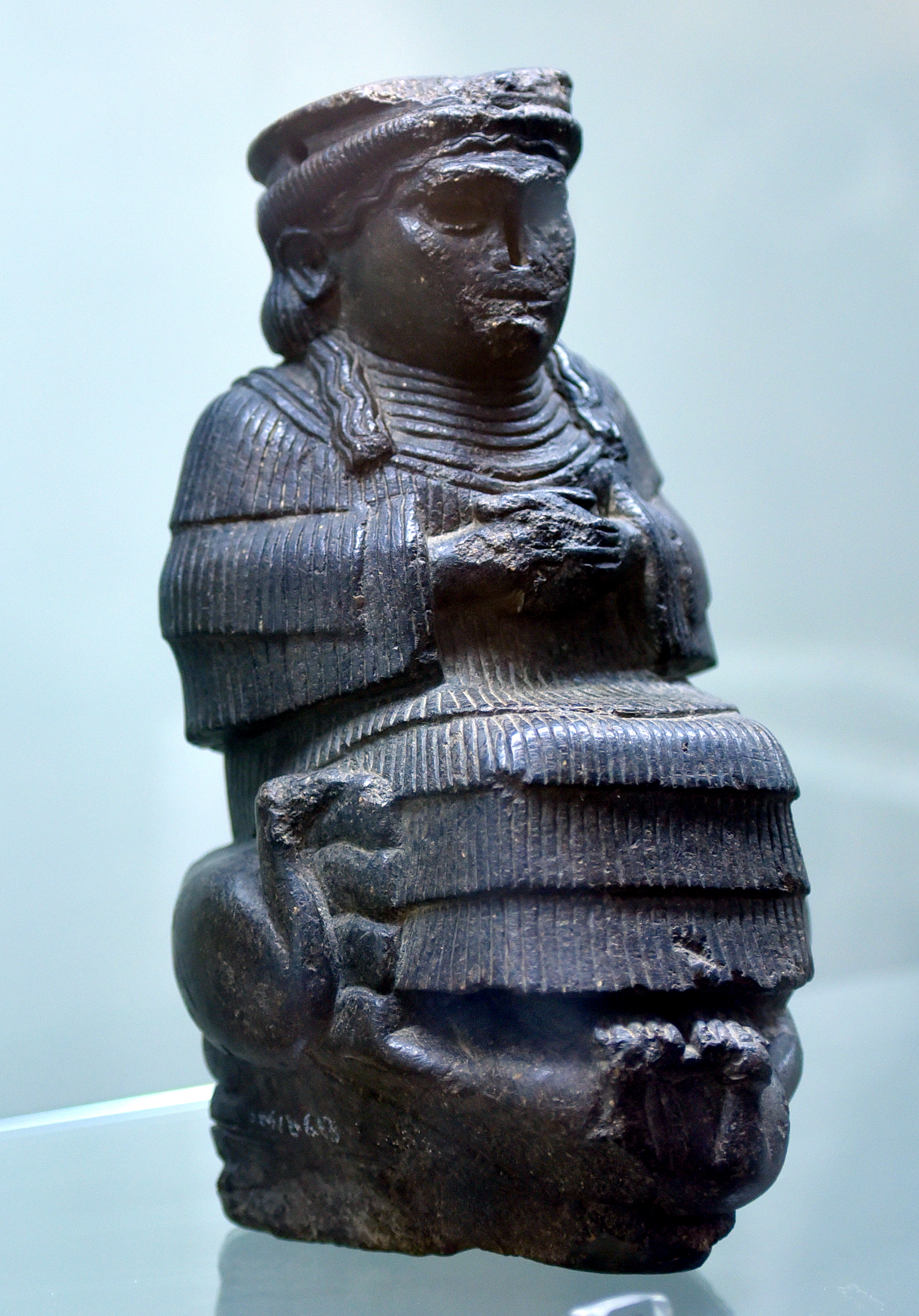
A seated figurine of Bau from Ur, on display in Iraq Museum.

The earliest sources represent Bau as a "life-giving" and "motherly" deity. A hymn from the reign of Ishme-Dagan preserves a tradition according to which she was believed to be the mother of mankind. While not a healing goddess at first, Bau acquired traits of this class of deities at some point in the third millennium BCE. In sources from the third millennium BCE Bau is the only goddess belonging to this group referred to as an asû, "physician". At the same time, there is no evidence that physicians were involved in her cult, in contrast with the cults of Gula, Ninisina and Nintinugga. This might indicate her healing role was associated with domestic religious practices. As a healing goddess Bau was associated with midwifery. She could be described as (ama) arḫuš, "merciful (mother)". It has been proposed that this epithet reflected "the knowledge of the female body," and that it designated deities bearing it as midwives. A hymn praising Bau as a divine midwife was composed to celebrate the birth of the child of queen Kubatum, wife of Shu-Sin.

Bau was also regarded as a goddess of abundance, and as such was depicted with a vase with flowing streams of water in art. Furthermore, she was believed to be capable of mediating with other deities on behalf of supplicants.

A depiction of Bau accompanied by a snake is known from a seal, and according to Julia M. Asher-Greve might indicate this animal was perceived as her symbol in the role of a healing deity. This interpretation has been questioned by Irene Sibbing-Plantholt, who points out that while the owner of the seal, a certain Ninkalla, was a midwife, there is no other evidence for the association between Bau and snakes, and the animal therefore might fulfill a general apotropaic role. In other contexts, presumably pertaining to her role as a wife or mother, Bau could be depicted with scorpions (associated with marriage), swans or miscellaneous waterfowl. The various symbols assigned to her indicate that she was a multifaceted deity with a fluid sphere of influence. However, identifying depictions of Bau in art postdating the end of the third millennium BCE is difficult.

== Associations with other deities ==
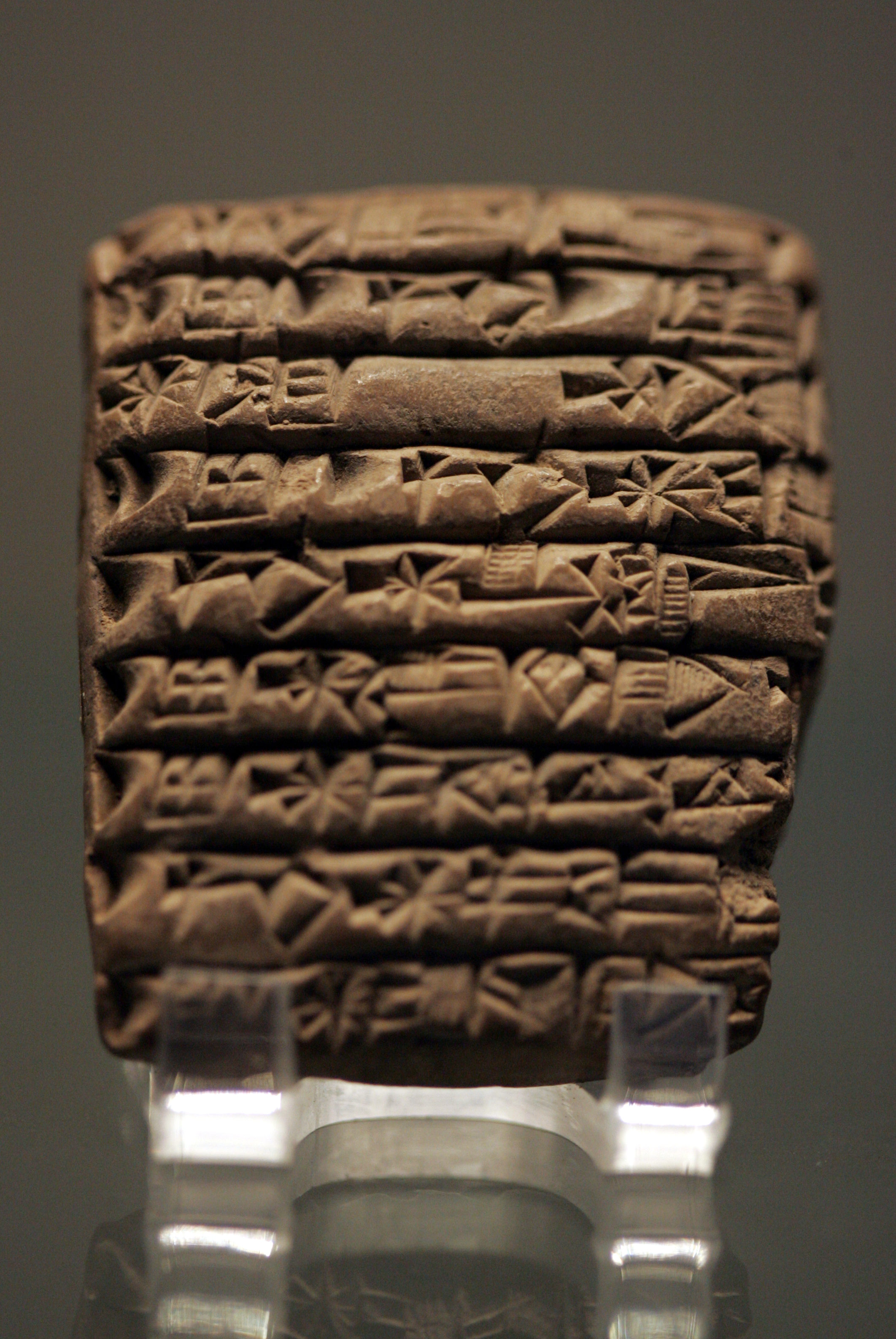
A tablet mentioning sacrifices made to various gods worshiped in the state of Lagash, including Bau.

Bau's father was An, as already attested in an inscription of Gudea. She was described as his firstborn daughter sometimes. According to Ryan D. Winters in the third millennium BCE in Lagash Gatumdug was regarded as Bau's mother. However, this role could also be fulfilled in Abba or Abau (the latter form can also be romanized as Ababa; the romanization of the name is uncertain similarly as in the case of Bau), attested in the Lamentation over the Destruction of Ur and in the god list An = Anum. In the latter source both Abau and Gatumdug appear, but only the former is described as Bau's mother (tablet V, line 58), while the latter is instead equated with Bau (tablet V, line 60). Another deity named Abau, known from An = Anum passage and first millennium BCE lamentations, was instead male and could be described as a son of Bau. In An = Anum he appears separately from Bau and is described as the husband of Gula (tablet V, line 52). This deity is presumed to be identical with Abu from the myth of Enki and Ninhursag.

Bau's husband was initially Ningirsu. One of the few known reliefs showing a god with his wife sitting in his lap is most likely a depiction of this couple from the reign of Gudea (another similar one is instead interpreted as a depiction of Nanna and Ningal from the reign of Ur-Namma). Such images were meant to highlight that the divine couples, depicted as loving spouses, act in unison, and that the corresponding kings had a special relation to them. References to Bau and Ningirsu as a couple are also known from later sources, for example two curse formulas inscribed on kudurru (boundary stones). In sources from Lagash, the siblings Igalim and Shulshaga were regarded as their sons. Furthermore, an inscription of Gudea labels the goddess Ḫegir as their daughter. The composition preserved on the Gudea cylinders states she was a member of a group referred to as "the seven lukur priestesses of Ningirsu" or "the septuplets of Bau". Another goddess from this group, Urnunta-ea, could be addressed as a daughter of Bau and Ningirsu as early as during the reigns of Urukagina and Ur-Ningirsu I, though she is also attested as a child of Lisin (An = Anum tablet II, line 77). Furthermore, Ryan D. Winters suggests that the deity Zurmuzarmu, who occurs in An = Anum (tablet II, line 105) in a context indicating association with Kesh, is a later reflection of the names of two other of the seven lukur, Zurmu and Zarmu. It is possible that this reflects a degree of interchange between the circles of deities regarded as members of Bau's court and those associated with the local pantheon of Kesh.

In Kish, where Bau was introduced in the Old Babylonian period, she was regarded as the spouse of Zababa, a local war god. An early reference to Bau and Zababa as a couple is known from the Lament for Sumer and Ur. Joan Goodnick Westenholz argues that initially Zababa was the husband of Ishtar of Kish (regarded as separate from Ishtar of Uruk), but after the Old Babylonian period she was replaced in the role of his spouse by Bau, though she continued to be worshiped independently. However, as pointed out by Ryan D. Winters, while this assumption can be found in other modern publications as well, no primary sources identify Zababa and Ishtar of Kish as spouses; he states that even if a connection other than sharing a cult center existed between them, there is no certainty it was marital. In An = Anum, Bau occurs both as the wife of Zababa (tablet V, line 48) and Ningirsu (tablet V, line 56). Winters notes that at the time of this text's composition pairing her with Ningirsu represented a stronger tradition. However, references to her and Zababa as a couple are common from the Middle Babylonian period onward. They appear together in various religious texts, including the incantation series Šurpu, a hymn to Nanaya, and various compositions from the north of Babylonia. The tradition presenting them as a couple is also known from Assyrian sources, for example from a treaty of Ashur-nirari V.

An association between Bau and Nergal is attested in Old Babylonian sources from Ur and in a single text from Larsa.

Bau's divine vizier (sukkal) was the goddess Lammašaga, "good guardian angel (lamma)", lamma being a class of tutelary and intercessory minor goddesses in Mesopotamian religion. She had a temple of her own in Lagash, and hymns dedicated to her are known from the curriculum of scribal schools. In the past, attempts were sometimes made to prove she was a manifestation of Bau rather than a separate goddess, but this view is no longer considered plausible. A hymn formerly believed to be a praise of Bau, while sometimes referred to as Bau A according to the ETCSL naming system, has been subsequently identified as a composition dedicated to Lammašaga instead. Bau herself was possibly sometimes addressed as a lamma in Lagash. In a handful of inscriptions, Bau's mother, left nameless in them, is also designated as such a deity. Furthermore, in An = Anum a goddess named Lamma-Bau is described as Bau's daughter (tablet V, line 186).

=== Bau and medicine goddesses ===
A degree of syncretism occurred between Bau and Ninisina, and the former is explained as the name of the latter used in Girsu in the composition Ninisina and the Gods. A hymn composed on behalf of Ishme-Dagan describes Bau with epithets which normally belonged to Ninisina. It is possible that the development of a connection between these goddesses was politically motivated and was supposed to help the kings of Isin with posing as rightful successors of earlier influential dynasties. According to Manuel Ceccarelli it developed in parallel with the connection between their respective husbands, Ningirsu and Pabilsag. The character of Bau and Ninisina was however not identical, for example the former typically does not appear in incantations and was not invoked as an opponent of demons, unlike the latter. Bau's lack of association with dogs, which sets her apart from other healing goddesses, might be related to this difference.

Another medicine goddess associated with Bau was Gula, though they were not closely connected with each other until the late second millennium BCE. They were likely regarded as analogous in the Middle Assyrian period, with examples including the interchangeable use of their names in colophons and direct equation in a local Assurian recension of the Weidner god list, but they were not always viewed as identical. Irene Sibbing-Plantholt suggests that the title Bau ša qēreb Aššur might have been used to differentiate Bau as a name of Gula and Bau as an independent goddess. In the Gula Hymn of Bulluṭsa-rabi, composed at some point between 1400 and 700 BCE, Bau is listed as one of the names of the eponymous goddess. This composition, despite equating various goddesses with Gula, nonetheless preserves information about the individual character of each of them. The section dedicated to Bau highlights her role as a life-giving deity. However, a late Babylonian incantation states that Gula was "exalted by the command of Bau", which indicates they were viewed as separate. They also occur separately from each other in sources pertaining to a festival held in Uruk in the first millennium BCE. Bau's association with Zababa was also exclusive to her.

== Worship ==
=== Third millennium BCE ===
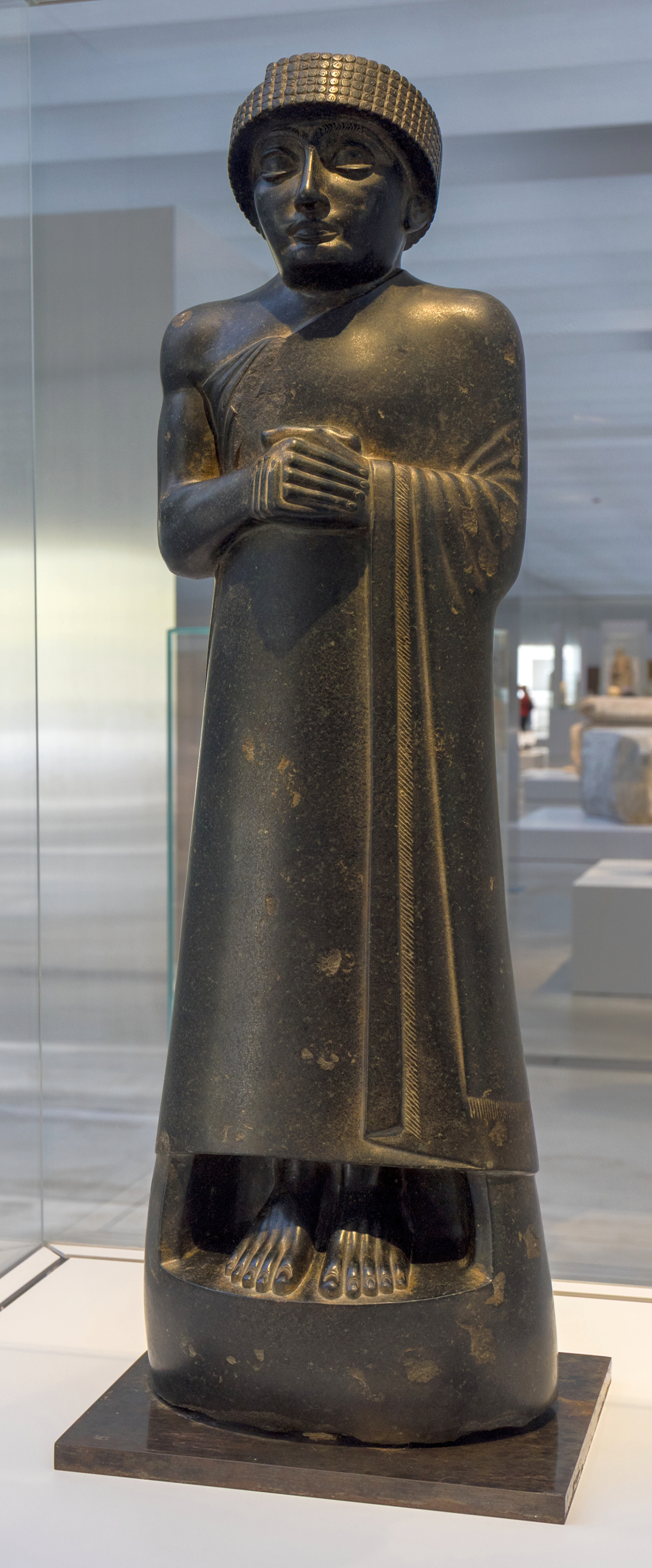
Statue of Gudea, a king who elevated the rank of Bau in the local pantheon of Lagash.

While the oldest attestations of Bau come from scribal school texts from Shuruppak from the Early Dynastic period, her original cult center was Girsu. Her main shrine bore the ceremonial name Egalgasu, "house filled with counsel", and was a part of the Etarsirsir, a temple dedicated to her located in the Uru-ku, the "sacred quarter" of the city. References to this house of worship are already known from the reign of Ur-Nanshe. Bau was also worshiped in the Eninnu, which was primarily a temple of Ningirsu. The name Etarsirsir also referred to Bau's temple in the city of Lagash, though she was not yet worshiped there in the Early Dynastic period. It has been suggested that this might indicate she was initially not a separate goddess, but a secondary name of Lagashite Gatumdug, but this explanation is not considered plausible. Attested members of the staff of Bau's temples from the Early Dynastic period include various types of clergy (for example gudu and gala); temple administrators (sanga); writers (dub-sar); musicians (nar); housekeepers (agrig); various artisans; shepherds; fishermen; and more. Multiple kings of Lagash dedicated votive offerings to Bau, with particularly many being known from the reign of Uru'inimgina. Some of the Lagashite rulers, including him, as well as Eanatum and Lugalanda, referred to Bau as their divine mother, though sometimes this role was fulfilled by Gatumdug instead, for example in the case of Enanatum I and Enmetena. Bau's association with kings extended to the cult of deceased rulers as well. She appears frequently in theophoric names from Lagash. Examples include Bau-alša ("Bau shows mercy"), Bau-amadari ("Bau is the eternal mother"), Bau-dingirmu ("Bau is my deity"), Bau-gimabaša ("Who is merciful like Bau?"), Bau-ikuš ("Bau takes care"), Bau-menmu ("Bau is my crown"), Bau-umu ("Bau is my light"), Gan-Bau ("servant of Bau"; the first element is feminine), Geme-Bau ("maid of Bau"), Lu-Bau ("man of Bau"), and more.

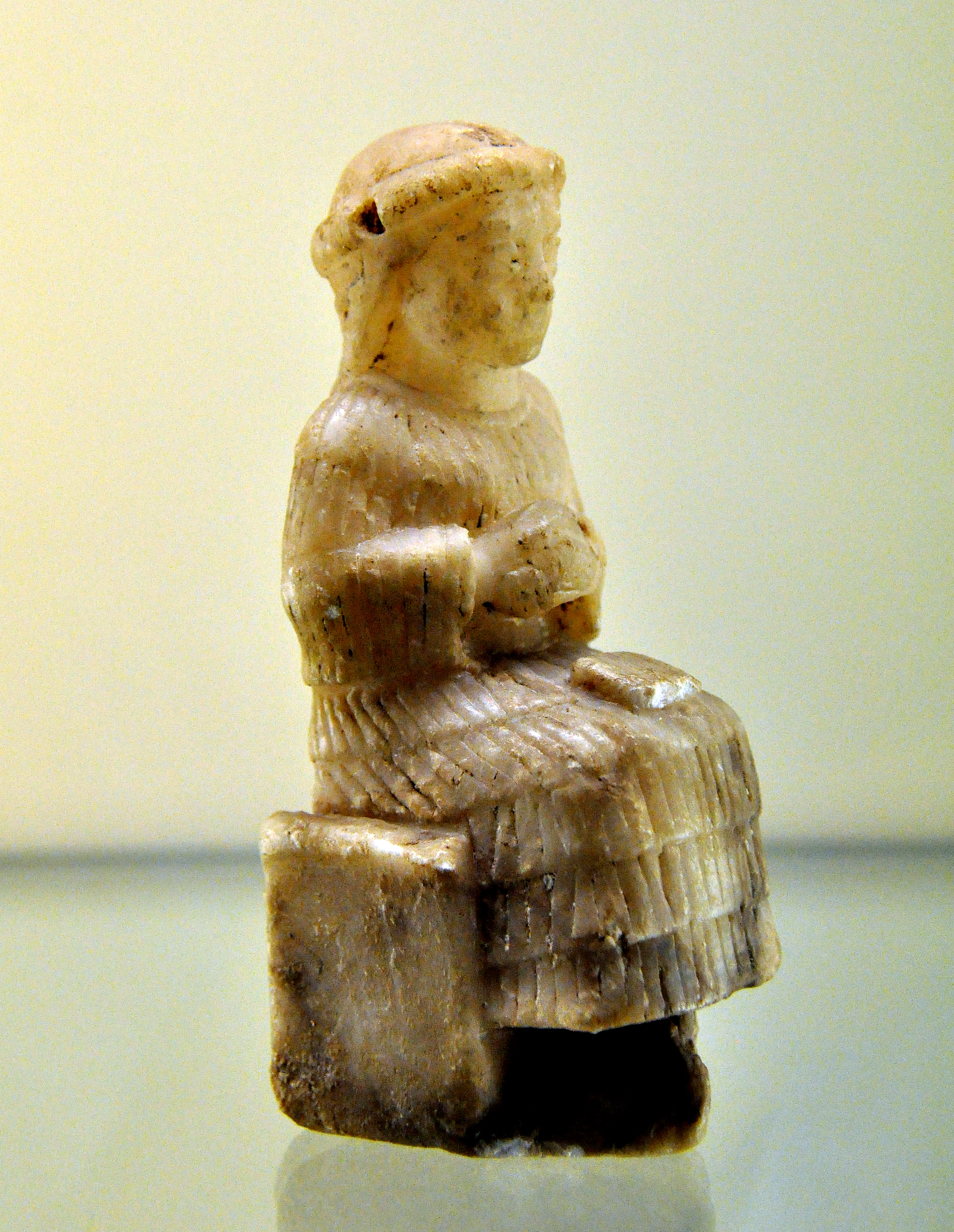
Mesopotamian goddess, probably Bau, sitting on a stool, from Southern Mesopotamia, Iraq. C. 2000 BCE. Pergamon Museum, Berlin, Germany

Bau's importance grew further during the reign of the Second Dynasty of Lagash (c. 2230-2110 BCE) due to her association with Ningirsu. Gudea elevated her to a rank equal with him, and referred to her as the "queen who decides the destiny in Girsu". This reform made her the highest ranking goddess of the local pantheon of Lagash, which was previously the position of Nanshe. During the subsequent reign of the Third Dynasty of Ur, Bau was the second most notable goddess worshiped chiefly in association with her respective husband after Ninlil. The highest cultic official of Bau in the province of Lagash, and as a result one of the most powerful political figures in it was an ereš-dingir priestess. One of the holders of this office was a certain Geme-Lamma, who is known from inscription on a number of seals. While servants and scribes are depicted led by minor goddesses to meet with Bau on seals, she was depicted interacting with the goddess directly. In the same period Bau came to be worshiped in Nippur, though neither she not her husband Ningirsu were major members of the local pantheon. According to Walther Sallaberger, she received offerings in the Ešumša, the temple of Ninurta.

=== Later attestations ===
Kings from the dynasty of Isin, in particular Ishme-Dagan, showed interest in the cult of Bau, though she was not introduced to the pantheon of Isin itself, and in documents from it she only appears in theophoric names. Evidence for the worship of Bau from the Old Babylonian period is scarce. In Ur she is only attested near its end, always in association with Nergal. While the original Lagashite cult of Bau declined alongside the city (a situation analogous to that of Ningirsu as an independent deity, as well as other southern deities such as Shara and Nanshe), she continued to be worshiped in Kish in northern Babylonia. Old Babylonian evidence for the presence of her worshipers in this city includes a record from the reign of Ammi-Ditana which mentions a woman serving as a courtyard purifier (kisalluḫḫatum) of this goddess, and a seal from Hammurabi's time whose owner referred to herself as a servant of Zababa and Bau. She remained a major goddess of that city as late as the Neo-Babylonian period. An inscription from the reign of Nebuchadnezzar II mentions the rebuilding of the local temple Edubba for both the city god, Zababa, and for Bau. A cella dedicated to her bore the name Egalgasu, which originally referred to her shrine in Girsu.

Elsewhere in the Middle Babylonian period and beyond, Bau retained a degree of popularity, and next to Ishtar and Gula she was the most commonly invoked goddess in theophoric names. One historically notable example is Bau-asītu, a daughter of Nebuchadnezzar II. In Babylon, "Bau of Kish" was celebrated during certain festivals in the temple of Gula. According to Andrew R. George, the temple Eulšarmešudu, "house of jubilation and perfect me", possibly located in Der and known from an unpublished hymn, might have been dedicated to Bau. Her cult is also attested in Assyria, and a temple dedicated jointly to her and Zababa existed in Assur.

While Bau was not yet worshiped in Uruk in the Neo-Babylonian period, she is mentioned in a text describing the procession of deities who took part in the akītu festival which was celebrated in this city in the Seleucid period. She also occurs in a single theophoric name from this location.
