= É (temple) =

Sumerian word or symbol for house or temple

É (Cuneiform: 𒂍)

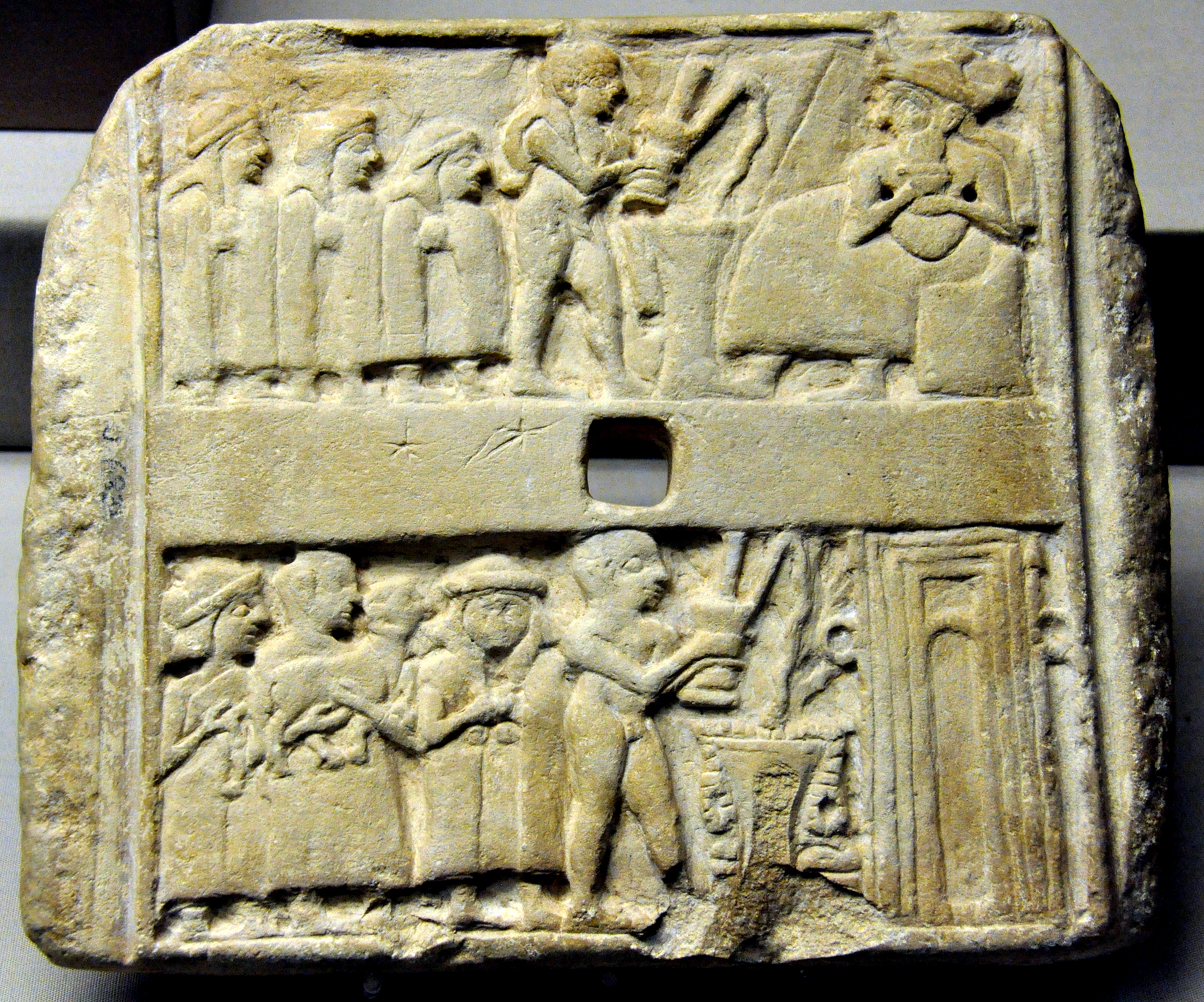
Wall plaque showing libations by devotees and a naked priest, to a seated god and a temple. Ur, 2500 BCE.

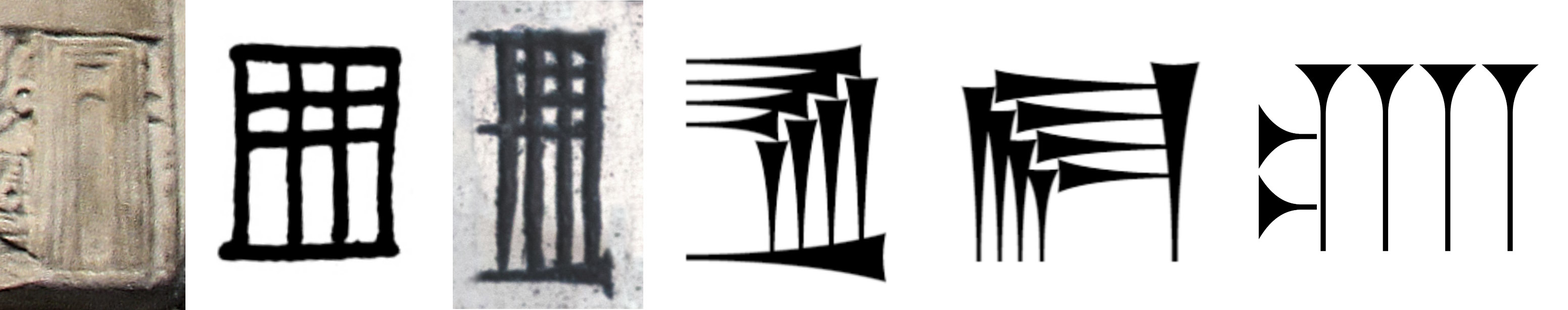
Evolution of the word "Temple" (Sumerian: "É") in cuneiform, from a 2500 BCE relief in Ur, to Assyrian cuneiform circa 600 BCE.

Neo-Assyrian form of the É sign

É (Cuneiform: 𒂍) is the Sumerian word or symbol for house or temple.

The Sumerian term É.GAL (𒂍𒃲,"palace", literally "big house") denoted a city's main building. É.LUGAL (𒂍𒈗,"king's house") was used synonymously. In the texts of Lagash, the É.GAL is the center of the Ensi's administration of the city, and the site of the city archives. Sumerian É.GAL is the probable etymology of Semitic words for "palace, temple", such as Hebrew היכל heikhal, and Arabic هيكل haykal. It has thus been speculated that the word É originated from something akin to *hai or *ˀai, especially since the cuneiform sign È is used for /a/ in Eblaite.

The term TEMEN (𒋼) appearing frequently after É in names of ziggurats is translated as "foundation pegs", apparently the first step in the construction process of a house; compare, for example, verses 551–561 of the account of the construction of E-ninnu:

He stretched out lines in the most perfect way; he set up (?) a sanctuary in the holy uzga. In the house, Enki drove in the foundation pegs, while Nanše, the daughter of Eridu, took care of the oracular messages. The mother of Lagaš, holy Ĝatumdug, gave birth to its bricks amid cries (?), and Bau, the lady, first-born daughter of An, sprinkled them with oil and cedar essence. En and lagar priests were detailed to the house to provide maintenance for it. The Anuna gods stood there full of admiration.

Temen has been occasionally compared to Greek temenos "holy precinct", but the latter has a well established Indo-European etymology (from *temə- meaning to cut).

In E-temen-an-ki, "the temple of the foundation (pegs) of heaven and earth", temen has been taken to refer to an axis mundi connecting earth to heaven (thus re-enforcing the Tower of Babel connection), but the term re-appears in several other temple names, referring to their physical stability rather than, or as well as, to a mythological world axis; compare the Egyptian notion of Djed.

== List of specific temples ==
- E-ab-lu-a - 𒂍𒀖𒇻𒀀, (House with teeming cattle) temple to Suen in Urum
- E-ab-šag-a-la - 𒂍𒀊𒊮𒀀𒇲, (House which stretches over the midst of the sea) temple to Ninmarki in Gu-aba
- E-abzu - 𒂍𒍪𒀊 , "temple of the abzu" (also E-engura "House of the subterranean waters") temple to Enki in Eridu.
- E-ad-da - 𒂍𒀜𒁕, temple to Enlil
- E-akkil - 𒂍𒃰𒋺𒋛, (House of lamentation) temple to Ninshubur in Akkil
- E-am-kur-kurra - 𒂍𒆳, "temple of the lord of lands" to Bēl in Assur
- E-^{d}ama-geštin "mother of wine"
- E-ama-lamma
- E-^{d}a-mal, temple in Babylon
- E-amaš-azag, "temple of the bright fold" in Dur-ilu
- E-ana (House of heaven) temple to Inanna in Uruk
- E-an-da-di-a, the ziggurat of Akkad
- E-an-ki, "temple of heaven and earth"
- E-a-nun, temple of Lugal-girra
- E-an-za-kar "temple of the pillar"
- E-a-ra-li "temple of the underworld"
- E-a-ra-zu-giš-tug "temple of the hearing of prayers"
- E-^{d}as-^{d}maḫ "temple of the supreme god"
- E-^{d}as-ra-tum "temple to the goddess Ashratum"
- E-babbar (Shining house) temple to Utu in Larsa
- E-bara-igi-e-di "temple of wonders", ziggurat to Dumuzi in Akkad
- E-bagara
- E-^{d}bau, temple to the goddess Bau in Lagash
- E-belit-mati "temple to the mother of the world"
- E-bur-sigsig (House with beautiful bowls) temple to Shara in Umma
- E-^{d}bur-^{d}sin, temple to the deified king Bur-Sin in Ur
- E-dam, built by Ur-Nanshe in Lagash
- E-dara-an-na "temple of the darkness of heaven"
- E-di-kud-kalam-ma "temple of the judge of the world"
- E-Dilmuna "temple of Dilmun" in Ur
- E-dim-an-na "temple of the bond of heaven", built by Nebuchadnezzar for Sin
- E-dim-gal-abzu in Lagash
- E-dim-gal-kalama (House which is the great pole of the Land) temple to Ishtaran in Der
- E-du-azaga "temple of the brilliant shrine", to Marduk
- E-du-kug (House of the sheer heap) in Eridu, Nippur
- E-dub (Storage house) temple to Zababa in Kish (Sumer)
- E-dubba, scribal schools
- E-duga
- E-dumi-zi-abzu, to Dumuzi-abzu, destroyed in the time of Urukagina
- E-^{d}dun-gi, temple to the deified king Dungi
- E-dur-gi-na "temple of the lasting abode", built by Nebuchadnezzar
- E-^{d}e-a, shrine to Ea (Enki) at Khorsabad built by Sargon.
- E-engura (House of the subterranean waters, also "E-abzu") temple to Enki in Eridu
- E-ešdam-kug in Girsu
- E-gida (Long house) temple to Ninazu in Enegir
- E-gud-du-shar (House with numerous perfect oxen) temple of Ningublaga in Ki-abrig
- E-ĝa-duda (House, chamber of the mound) temple to Shu-zi-ana in Nga-gi-mah
- E-ĝa-ĝiš-šua
- E-ĝalga-sud (House which spreads counsel far and wide) temple to Bau (goddess) in Iri-kug
- E-ĝeštug-Nisaba (House of the Wisdom of Nisaba) in Ur
- E-ĝipar in Uruk
- E-ĝiškešda-kalama (The House which is the bond of the Land) temple to Nergal in Kutha
- E-ḫamun (The House of Harmony)
- E-ḫursaĝ (The House which is a hill) of Shulgi in Ur
- E-ḫuš
- E-ibe-Anu, temple to Urash in Dilbat
- E-igi-kalama (House which is the eye of the Land) of Lugal-Marada/Ninurta in Marad
- E-igi-šu-galam
- E-igi-zi(d)-bar-ra, temple to Ningirsu, built by Entemena
- E-igizu-uru (House, your face is mighty) temple to Ninshubur in Akkil
- E-Iri-kug
- E-itida-buru
- E-kiš-nu-ĝal (House sending light to the earth (?)) temple to Nanna in Ur
- E-kug-nuna temple to Inanna in Uruk
- E-kur "mountain temple" to Enlil in Nippur
- E-ku-nin-azag "temple of the brilliant goddess" in Girsu
- E-maḫ (Great house) temple to Shara in Umma
- E-maḫ (Great house) temple to Ninhursanga in Adab.
- E-me-ur-ana (House which gathers the divine powers of heaven) temple to Ninurta in Nippur
- E-me-urur
- E-melem-ḫuš (House of terrifying radiance) temple to Nuska in Nippur
- E-mešlam, temple of Nergal
- E-mu-maḫ (House with a great name)
- E-mud-kura, in Ur
- E-muš (House which is the precinct) or E-mush-kalama, temple to Lulal in Bad-tibira
- E-namtila
- E-ni-guru
- E-nin.gara
- E-ninnu (House of 50), temple to Ningirsu in Lagash
- E-a-mer, the ziggurat of E-ninnu
- E-nun, the abzu in Eridu
- E-nun-ana (House of the prince of heaven), temple to Utu in Sippar
- E-nutura
- E-puḫruma
- E-sag-il "temple that raises its head", the temple of Marduk in Babylon, according to the Enuma elish home to all the gods under the patronage of Marduk.
- E-sara (Cuneiform: E_{2}SAR.A) "House of the Universe" dedicated to Inanna in Uruk by Ur-Nammu
- E-sikil (pure house) temple to Ninazu in Eshnunna
- E-sila
- E-Sirara
- E-šag-ḫula, in Kazallu
- E-šara, in Adab
- E-šeg-meše-du, in Isin
- E-šenšena, to Ninlil
- E-šerzid-guru (House clad in splendour) temple to Inanna in Zabala
- E-šu-me-ša (House which deals being rouge), temple to Ninurta in Nippur
- E-suga (Merry house)
- E-tar-sirsir
- E-temen-anki "temple of the foundation of heaven and earth", the ziggurat to Marduk in Babylon
- E-temen-ni-guru, main ziggurat of Ur
- E-tilla-maḫ
- E-Tummal (Tummal House), temple to Ninlil in Nippur
- E-tur-kalama
- E-uduna, built by Amar-Suena
- E-Ulmaš, in Akkad
- E-unir (House of gaze reach) temple to Enki in Eridu
- E-uru-ga
- E-zagin (Lapis lazuli house), temple to Nisaba in Uruk
- E-zida-temple to Nabu
- E-zi-Kalam-ma, to Inanna in Zabala, built by Hammurabi

== See also ==
- Ziggurat
- Bayt, a sacred stone thought to house a god or deity
- Bethel (Israel)
- Bethel (god)
- Temenos
