= Gaston Cros =

French army officer and archaeologist

- Gaston Cros as shown on his carte de visite
- Born: 6 October 1861; Alsace, France
- Died: 10 May 1915 (aged 53); Vimy, Artois, France
- Military career
- Allegiance: France
- Branch: French Army
- Service years: 1881–1915
- Rank: Colonel
- Conflicts: Zaian War; First World War: Western Front; First Battle of the Marne (WIA); Battle of the Yser; Second Battle of Artois †
- Awards: Commander of the Legion of Honour; Knight of the Order of the Dragon of Annam; Member of the Order of Glory of Tunisia; Golden Palms of the Ordre des Palmes Académiques; Croix de guerre 1914–1918 with palm Mentioned in Despatches

Colonel Marie Augstin Gaston Cros (known as Gaston Cros) (6 October 1861 – 10 May 1915) was a French army officer and archaeologist. He was born in Alsace and was displaced when that territory was incorporated into the German Empire. He joined the French Army as a lieutenant and saw action in Tonkin before spending several years surveying in Tunisia, receiving the honours of membership of Vietnamese and Tunisian orders and appointment as a chevalier of the Legion of Honour. In 1901 Cros was appointed head of the French archaeological expedition to Girsu, Iraq to continue the work of Ernest de Sarzec. His work over the next five years included the tracing of the 32.5-foot-thick (9.9 m) city wall, and for his work there he received a letter of commendation from Gaston Doumergue, the Minister of Fine Arts, and the award of the Golden Palms of the Ordre des Palmes Académiques. Promoted to lieutenant-colonel, Cros served in the French protectorate of Morocco from 1913, seeing action in the Zaian War.

Upon the outbreak of the First World War Cros was recalled to metropolitan France and fought in defence of Paris at the First Battle of the Marne, leading an ad hoc unit of zouaves and tirailleurs. He was wounded and spent two days directing his troops from a horse-drawn carriage before he was forced to leave his command. On 15 September 1914 he was promoted to colonel and subsequently received command of the 2nd Moroccan Brigade, which he led at the Battle of the Yser and the Second Battle of Artois. It was at Artois that he was killed in a German counter-attack. Cros' name is recorded alongside that of Colonel Pein, who commanded the 1st Moroccan Brigade at Artois, on the Moroccan Division Memorial at Vimy.

== Early life ==
Marie Augstin Gaston Cros was born at 2.00am on 6 October 1861 to Hippolyte Cros, a lawyer, and Marie Petronille Reine Scherb at Saverne, Bas-Rhin in the Alsace region. After Alsace was incorporated into the German Empire after the Franco-Prussian War of 1871 Cros' family chose to retain their French nationality and moved to Lunéville in Meurthe-et-Moselle. Cros volunteered for a five-year commission with the French Army on 25 October 1881 at Nancy. Four days later he was enrolled into the Ecole Spéciale Militaire de Saint-Cyr as a cadet, from which he graduated on 1 October 1883, ranked 261 out of 342 in his class. Cros was commissioned into the 128th Infantry Regiment as a sub-lieutenant and attended the L'Ecole du Tir (marksmanship school) in 1885 where he ranked 25th out of 76 participants.

Cros transferred to the 4th Tonkinese Rifles on 3 June 1887 and saw active service in Tonkin (northern Vietnam) from 19 June 1887 to 14 September 1888, joining the 105th Infantry Regiment as a lieutenant on 5 October 1887. He was awarded the Tonkin Expedition commemorative medal for his work in the country.

On 25 January 1889 Cros transferred to the 4th Zouave Regiment and was on active service in Tunisia from 11 March 1889 to 27 April 1898. He was attached to the Army Geographic Service from 1891 to 1893, and made several topographical surveys of the Sahara desert. Cros was appointed a knight of the Order of the Dragon of Annam and a member of the Tunisian Order of Glory on 10 October 1889 in recognition of his service in Tonkin and Tunisia. He was promoted to captain on 10 July 1894 and became a chevalier of the Legion of Honour on 29 December 1896. Cros transferred to the 39th Infantry Regiment on 5 April 1898 and served with them in Algeria from 11 November 1899 to 1 June 1900.

== Archaeological work at Tello ==
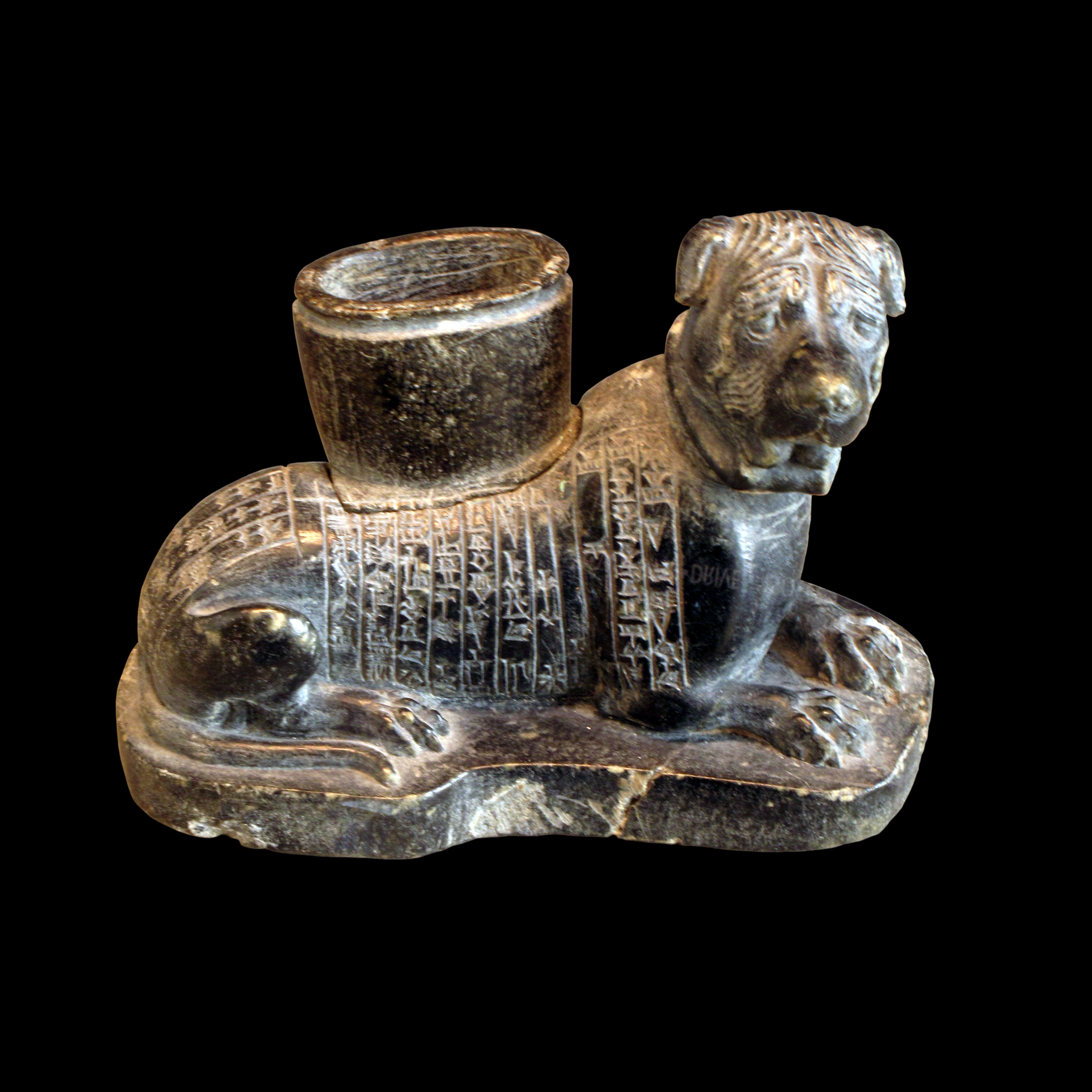
A votive dog excavated by Cros from Tello in 1904

From December 1901 Cros was placed in charge of the French-led Tello Expedition to the archaeological site of Girsu in Iraq. He replaced the late Ernest de Sarzec, the French consul of Basra, who died in 1901 and had been excavating Tello since 1877, having initiated the rediscovery of the Sumerian civilization. The appointment of a military man to this position might have been influenced by the revolt of the Muntafiq Arabs against the Ottoman Empire which created a hostile environment for the archaeologists. Cros' knowledge of archaeology, like Sarzac's, came from a purely amateur interest in the subject though he had a thorough understanding of desert topography from his surveying days. One of Cros' first acts was to move the site of the French camp nearer to the excavation area, having been previously situated an hours ride away. This made it less defensible and further from the water supply but he solved these problems by negotiating protection from the local Karagul Arabs and co-ordinating the construction of a new reservoir supplied with water by caravan convoys.

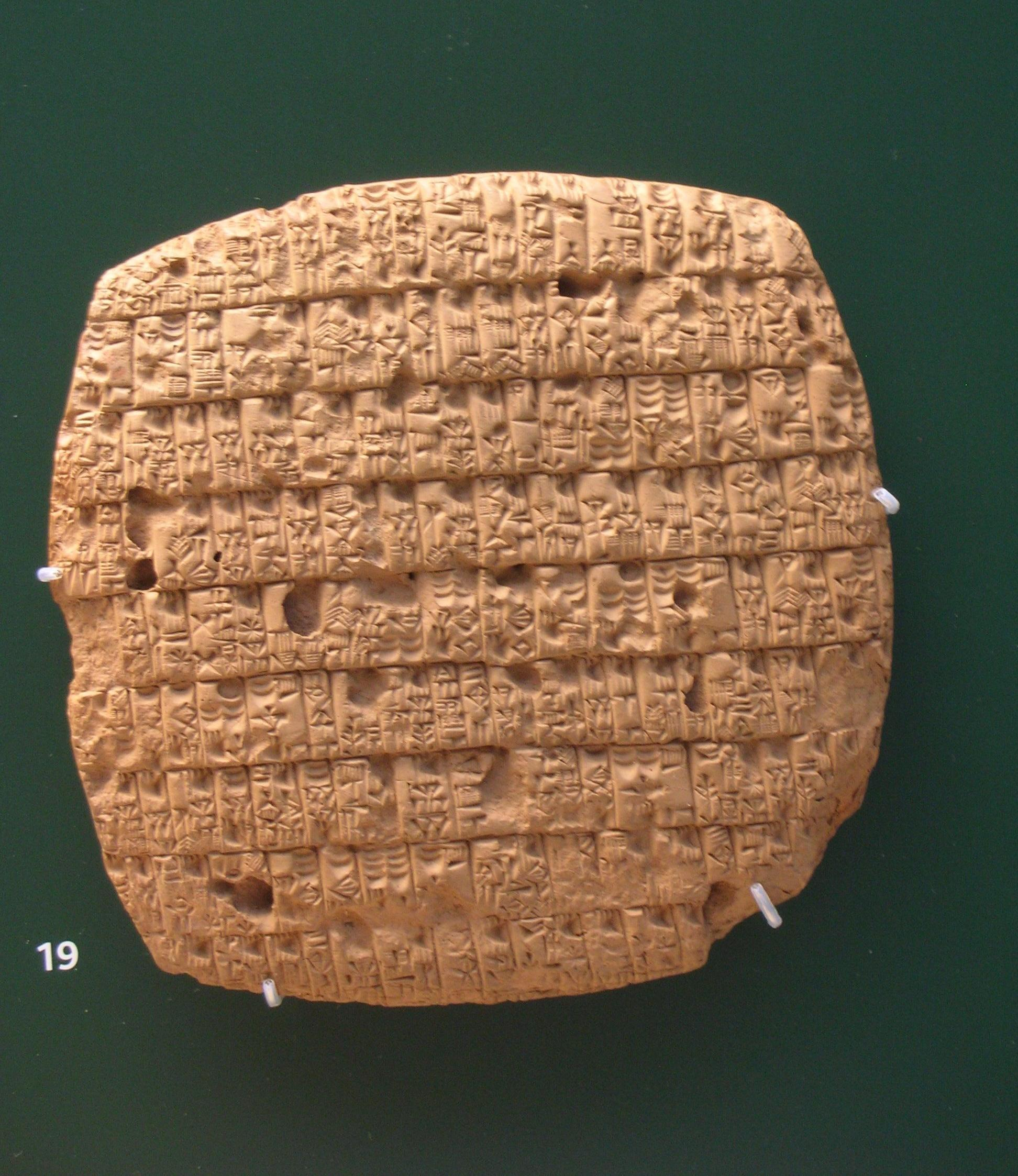
One of the Cuneiform Tello tablets

Cros undertook numerous excavations at Tello producing significant numbers of artefacts, some dating from the earliest periods of Sumerian civilization. One of his achievements, considered his most important at Tello, was the tracing of the great city wall which was 32.5 feet (9.9 m) thick. In 1903 he discovered a doorway in the vicinity of de Sarzac's famous cuneiform tablets that provided evidence that the tablets were stored as part of a state administrative archive.

During his time at Tello he remained nominally with the 39th Infantry Regiment, transferring to the 80th Infantry Regiment on 17 February 1903. His archaeological work was recognised by promotion to chef de bataillon (roughly equivalent to major), in the 116th Infantry Regiment, on 24 June 1905 and by appointment as an officer of the Legion of Honour on 12 March 1906.

Cros transferred to the 33rd Infantry Regiment on 25 May 1906 and to the 5th Infantry Regiment on 22 December of that year. He left Tello after his posting to the 5th Regiment but returned in 1909 to conclude his research, for which he was commended by Gaston Doumergue, the Minister of Fine Arts. His research, published in the book Nouvelles Fouilles de Tello (New Excavations at Tello) in 1911, was welcomed by the British Royal Asiatic Society as some of the most important on the subject of ancient Sumeria. When Cros left Tello in 1909 the French government was unable to find a suitable successor. Cros received the Golden Palms of the Ordre des Palmes Académiques for his academic work. A replacement was eventually found in 1914 but the outbreak of war prevented his assuming the post and the next chief of the French mission wasn't appointed until 1928.

Cros was later promoted to lieutenant colonel of the 1st Algerian Tirailleurs. In April 1913 he transferred to the 5th Algerian Tirailleurs and undertook expeditions in Western Morocco from May to August 1913 for which he was commended. He subsequently participated in the Zaian War under General Hubert Lyautey, leading a column from Rabat to capture Khénifra. Other columns were led by Lieutenant-Colonel Henri Claudel from Meknes and Colonel Noël Garnier-Duplessix from Kasbah Tadla.

== First World War ==
A wounded Cros directs his men from a horse-drawn carriage as drawn in a contemporary issue of L'Illustré National

After the outbreak of the First World War Cros returned to France from Africa, with the 8th Marching Regiment (an ad hoc unit made up of tirailleurs and zouaves). His unit was sent to defend Paris in the First Battle of the Marne where it was ordered to take the town of Saint-Prix, which changed hands five times in the first four days of the battle. The move was intended to clear the way for the 42nd Infantry Division to advance on Cros' left. He was wounded in the leg in an action at Mondement-Montgivroux on 9 September that earned him a mention in dispatches and, later, his description as "bravest of the brave". After two days spent following his unit in a horse-drawn carriage he was forced to leave his command.

On 15 September Cros received temporary promotion to colonel and on 20 October was given command of the 2nd Moroccan Brigade at the Battle of the Yser. His promotion was confirmed as permanent on 1 November 1914 and he became a commander of the Legion of Honour on 10 April 1915. He also received a further mention in dispatches as "a brave soldier, an experienced great leader, wise, prudent, with natural authority" and was awarded the Croix de Guerre with palm. In the spring he wrote to an archaeological colleague, Léon Heuzey, telling him that "I continue with my work as an archaeologist. As at Tello I record earthworks, but instead of artefacts of Gudea I find German shells, it is not without excitement".

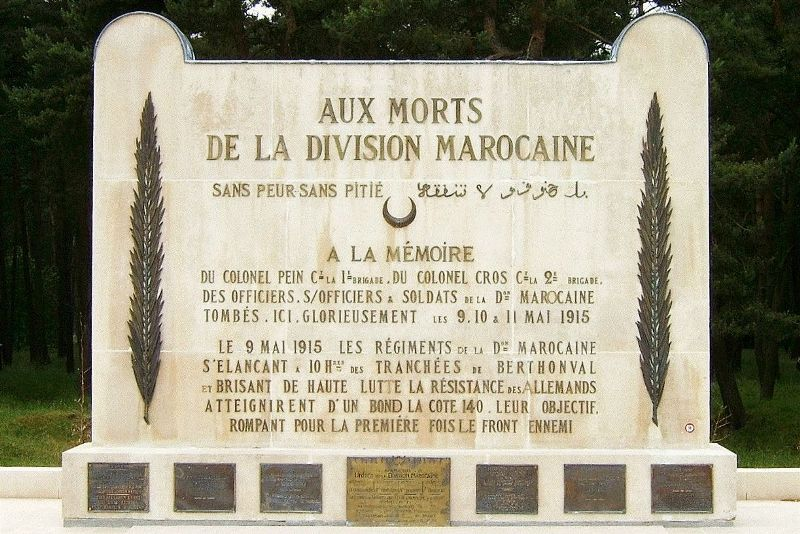
The Vimy Ridge Moroccan Division Memorial bearing Cros' name

Later that year Cros led his brigade, as part of the 1st Moroccan Infantry Division, at the Second Battle of Artois - an allied attempt to capture Vimy Ridge with an assault on a 13-mile-wide (21 km) stretch of the front. Cros took particular care to inspire a keen esprit de corps in his men and on the eve of the attack told them: "I am your father and you know that I love you as my children, if you want to show me that you love me in return, fight and kill lots of Boche". At 10 am on 9 May 1915, Cros' brigade advanced in conjunction with the division's 1st Brigade, a French Foreign Legion unit led by Colonel Pein. The five-hour preliminary bombardment was largely ineffective, and the division took heavy casualties in reaching the German lines, 3 miles (4.8 km) distant. However, they managed to push the Germans out, and some units even reached the villages of Vimy and Givenchy-en-Gohelle. The next morning, hit by their own artillery and under German counter-attack, the French were forced to withdraw to their own lines, in the course of which Cros was killed. Cros was one of almost 2,000 men of the Moroccan division killed in that action, as was fellow brigade commander Colonel Pein.

Cros' colleague Huezey described him later as "a trainer of men and a keen naturalist whose integrity was matched by his intelligence and bravery. His medals and uniform are held in the collection of the Musée zoologique de la ville de Strasbourg and he is remembered in the inscription on the Moroccan Division Memorial at Vimy.

To the fallen of the Moroccan Division

Without fear, without mercy

To the memory of Colonel Pein, Commander of the 1st Brigade, of Colonel Cros, commander of the 2nd Brigade, officers, non-commissioned officers and soldiers of the Moroccan Division who gloriously gave their lives on 9, 10 and 11 May 1915. On 9 May 1915, the regiments of the Moroccan Division at 10AM launched their offensive from the Berthonval trenches and successfully overcame fierce resistance from the German side to claim victory over Hill 140, their objective - breaking through enemy lines for the very first time

— Translation of the inscription on the Moroccan Division Memorial at Vimy.
