= Vase of Entemena =

Silver vase from Mesopotamia

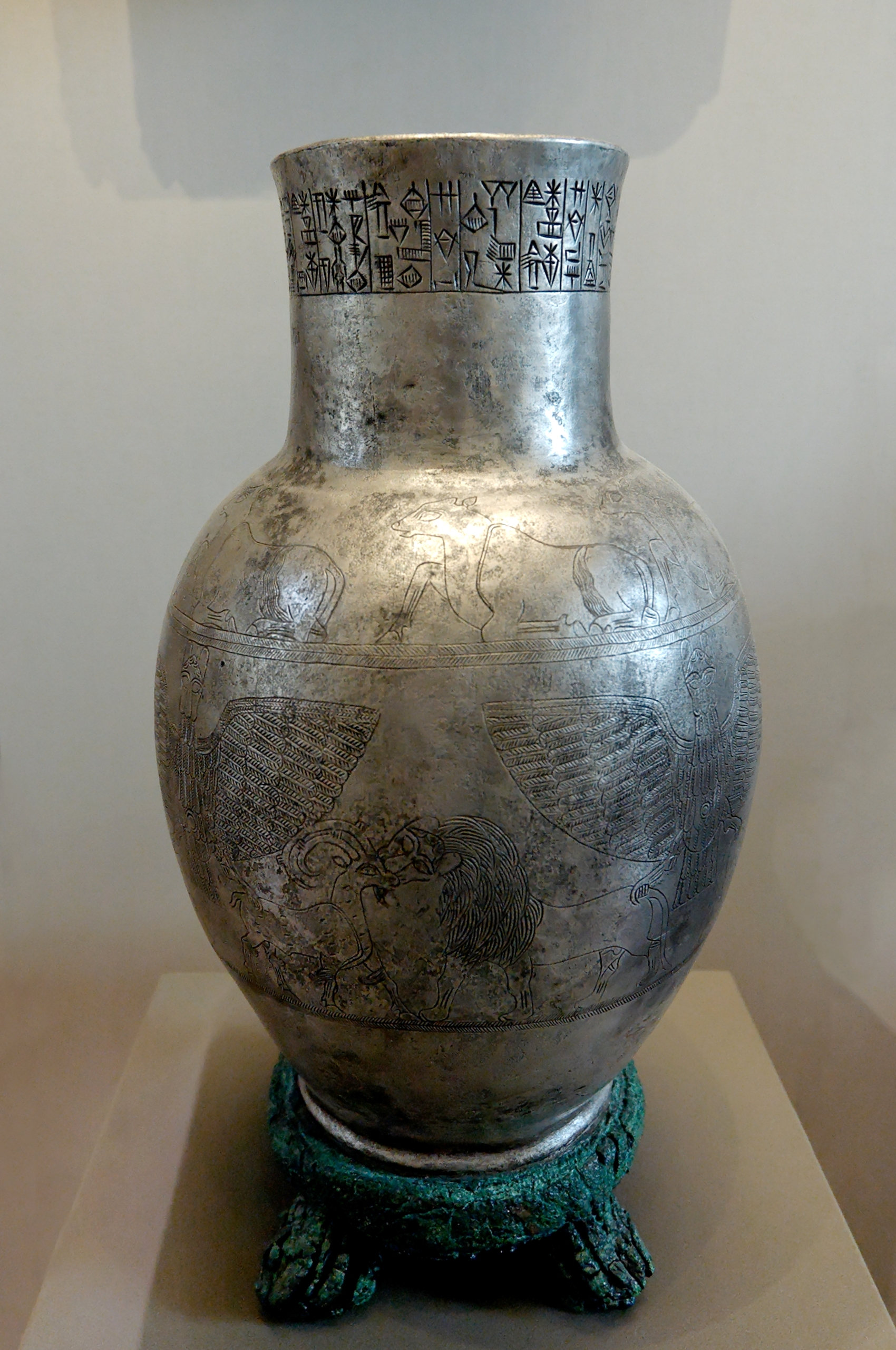
- Vase of Entemena in the Louvre
- Material: Silver
- Created: c. 2400 BCE
- Discovered: 1888; Dhi Qar, Iraq
- Discovered by: Ernest Sarzec

The Vase of Entemena is a tripod type silver vase and was named after Entemena, the ruler of Lagash in ancient Mesopotamia. This vase is believed to date back to c. 2400 BCE. It is believed to be dedicated to the war god Ningirsu. In 1910, Leonard William King described it as "the finest example of Sumerian metal work yet recovered."The legs of the vase are made of copper. On the surface of the vase, lightly engraved, is an image of Anzud the lion-headed eagle, grasping two lions with his talons.

== Discovery ==
The vase was recovered in Telloh in 1888 at the site of ancient Shirpurla by Ernest de Sarzec. It was donated to the Louvre by Sultan Abdul Hamid II in 1896 and was thought to be one of the oldest surviving examples of engraving on metal.

== See also ==
- Sumerian King List
