= Adadnadinakhe bricks =

Foundation bricks found at the Sumerian city of Girsu

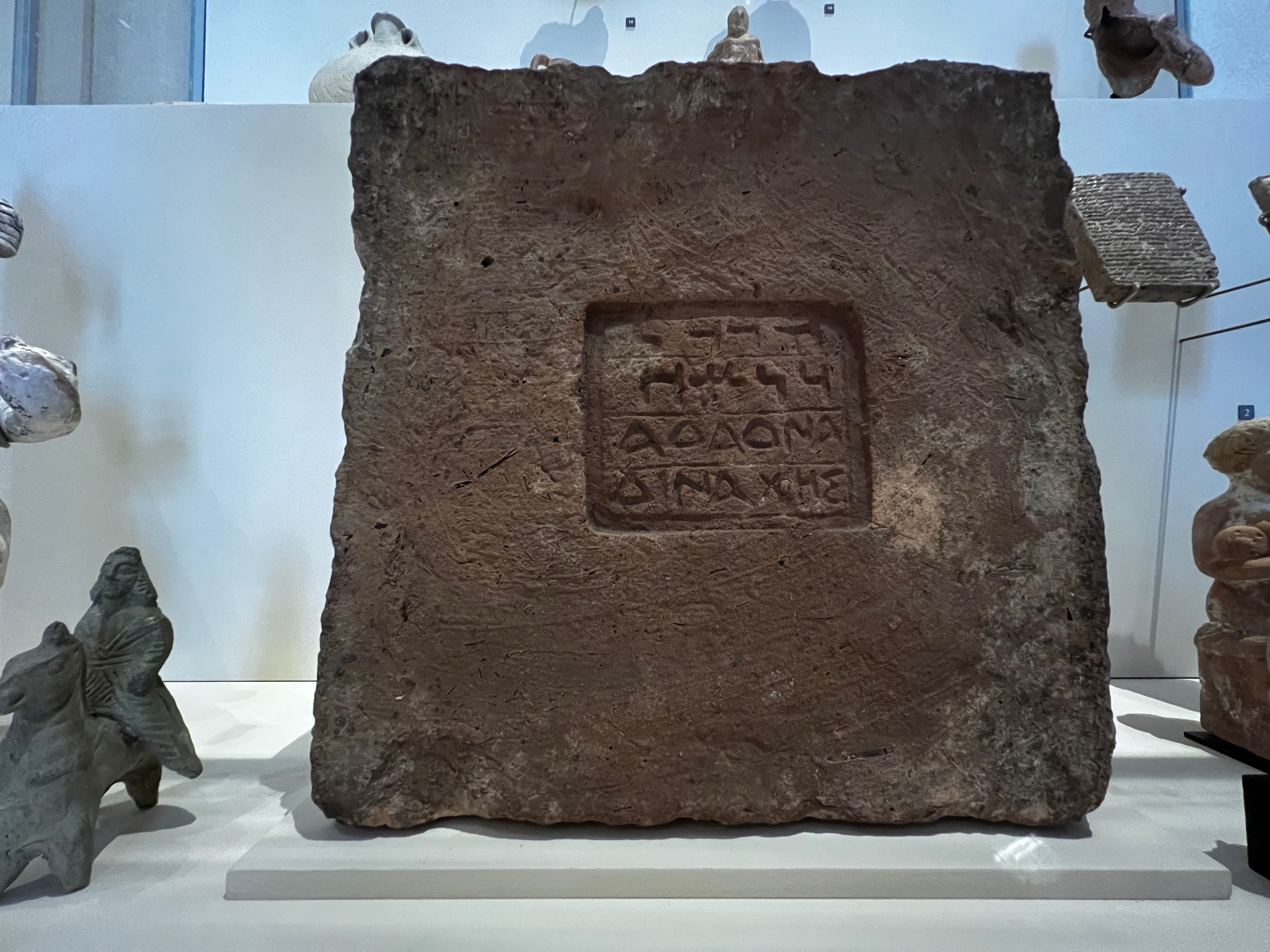
One of the bricks, AO 29762, in the Louvre room 230

The Adadnadinakhe bricks are a series of foundation bricks with mudbrick stamps discovered at the Sumerian city of Girsu bearing the name "Adadnadinakhe" in bilingual Greek and Aramaic inscriptions. The bricks date back to the Seleucid Empire – 300–100 BCE – whilst the name appears to match the name of a Babylonian king (Ashur-nadin-ahhe I or Ashur-nadin-ahhe II) who ruled more than a millennium beforehand. They form part of a larger group of Canaanite and Aramaic seal inscriptions.

The first known brick was discovered in the 1880s, and the most recent in the 2020s. The Aramaic inscription is known as NE 446c and CIS II 72.

Early examples of the brick are displayed in the Louvre and in the Vorderasiatisches Museum Berlin. In the Louvre, 21 examples from Girsu are known, in the series AO 29762–29782, of which AO 29762 is in room 230, AO 29775 is in room 310, and AO 29763 has been loaned to the Musée d'archéologie méditerranéenne in Marseille.

== Name ==
The name "Adadnadinakhe" appears in multiple spellings in scholarly literature, including "Adad-nadin-ahhe", "Adad-nadin-akhe," "Adadnadinache," and "Adadnadinaché". These are transliterations of the Greek version, Αδαδναδιναχης, with the differences relating to various transliterations of the ending χης.

The Aramaic spelling of the name on the inscription is 𐡄𐡃𐡃𐡍𐡃𐡍𐡀𐡇.

== Context ==
During the Selucid period in Babylonia, Greek was the primary language of administration whilst Aramaic was the primary local language

The name "Adadnadinakhe" means "Adad, the giver of brothers." It is considered to be of Babylonian origin. One theory is that it was used to invoke the protection of the god Adad in the construction of various religious and public buildings.

== Locations ==
The Adadnadinakhe bricks were discovered in Girsu (modern Telloh), including in the E-ninnu temple. Some of the bricks were found alongside the well-known Statues of Gudea.

William Hayes Ward wrote of seeing the bricks at Ernest de Sarzec’s excavations in Girsu in 1885.

== Possible explanations ==
They were typically located in the foundations of temples and other significant structures, similar to equivalent foundation bricks written in cuneiform throughout the region. The name "Adadnadinakhe" is consistently used, with the Aramaic always above the Greek, and with the same layout of the letters.

Various theories have been advanced regarding their original use:

- ceremonial contexts, such as a ritual or administrative practice, perhaps intended to reinforce the legitimacy and divine favor of the Seleucid rulers
- consecration the buildings in which they were placed, ensuring divine protection and blessing
- branding of a construction company

In 2024, Sébastien Rey of the British Museum's 2016-22 "Girsu Project", described their conclusions that the reason that the bricks were found among earlier artefacts is that Adadnadinakhe unearthed the statues of Gudea in order to add local legitimacy to his new Hellenistic shrine.

== Gallery ==
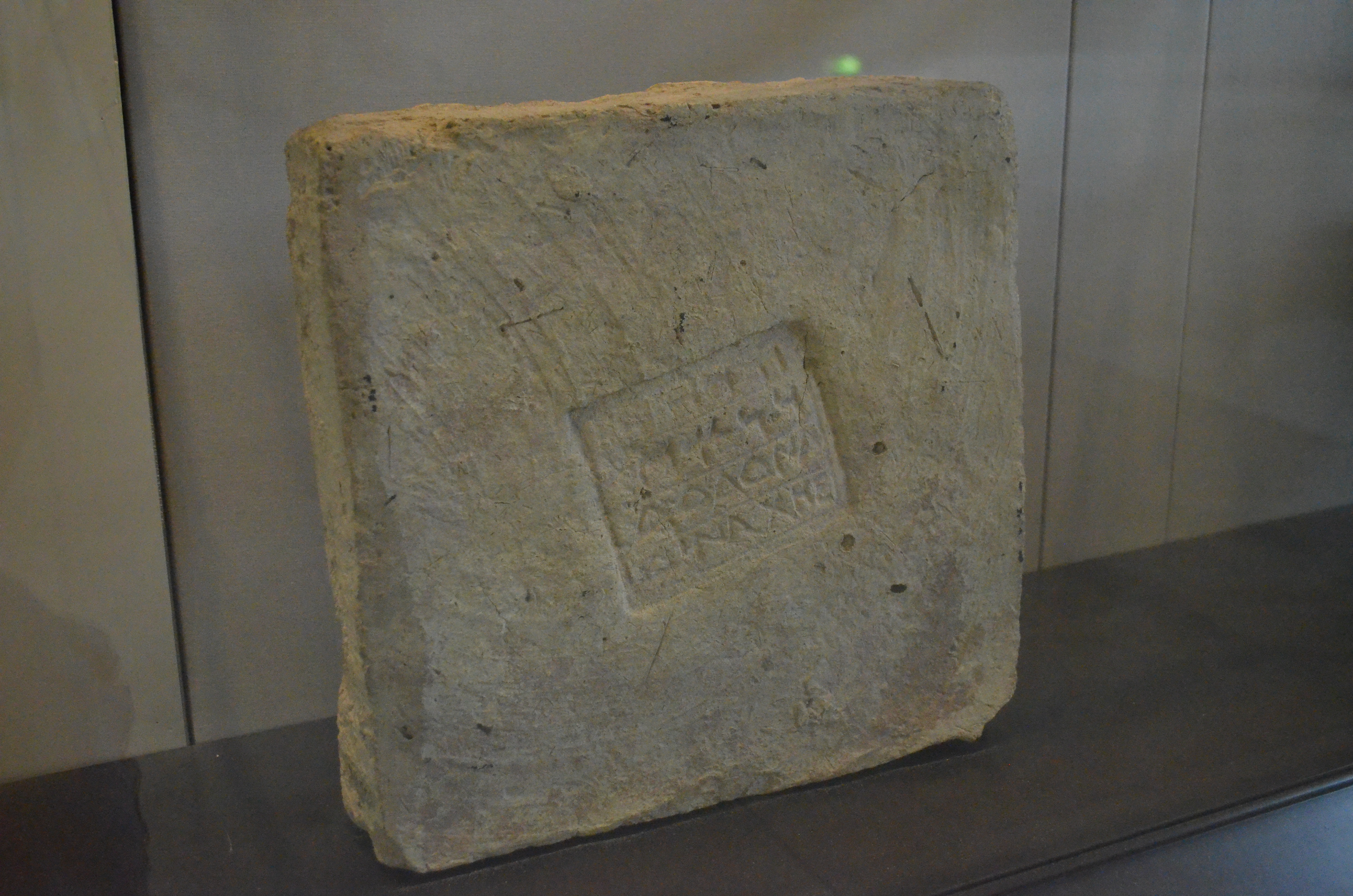
Louvre room 310 - AO 29775

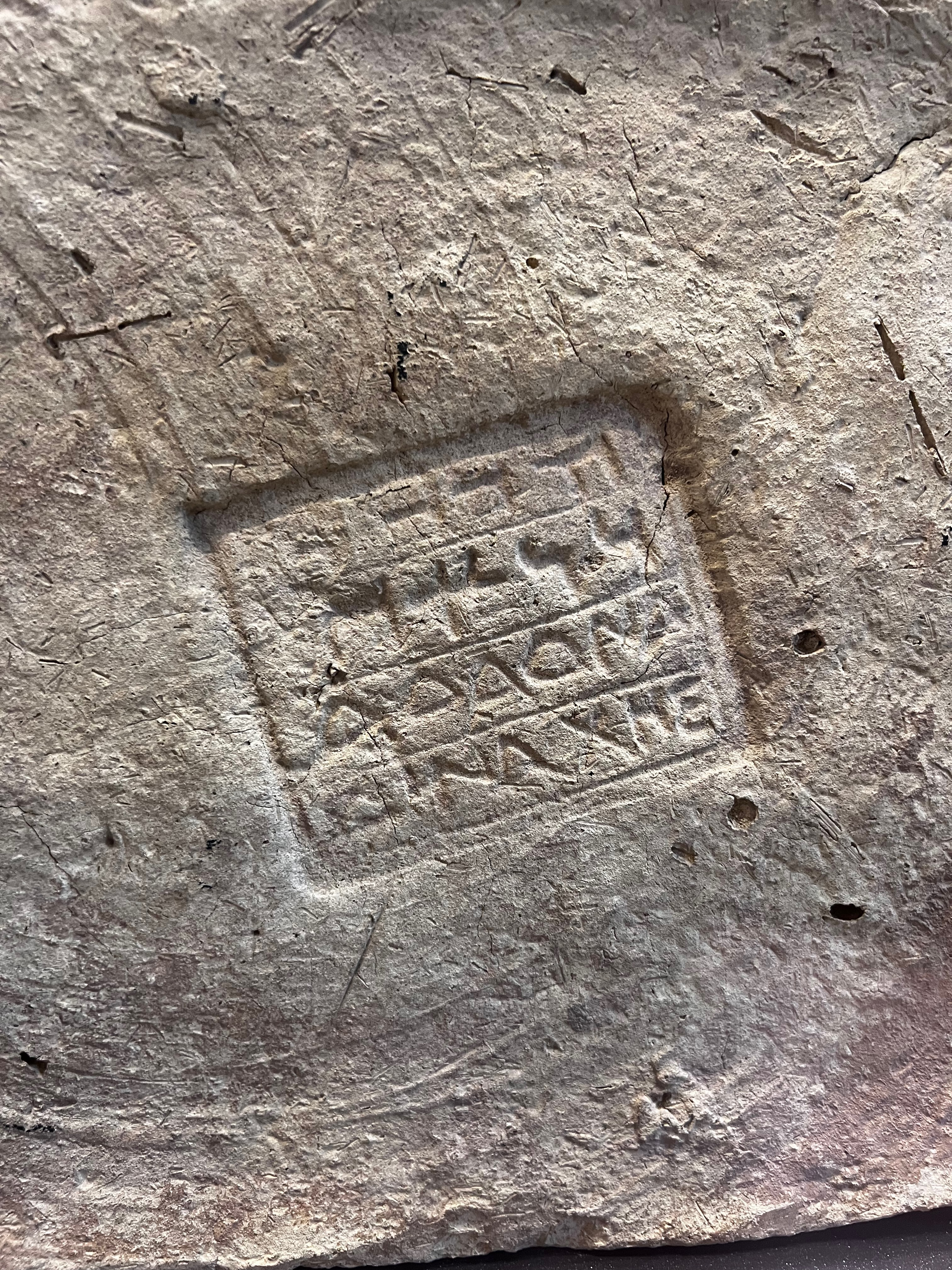
Close up of AO 29775

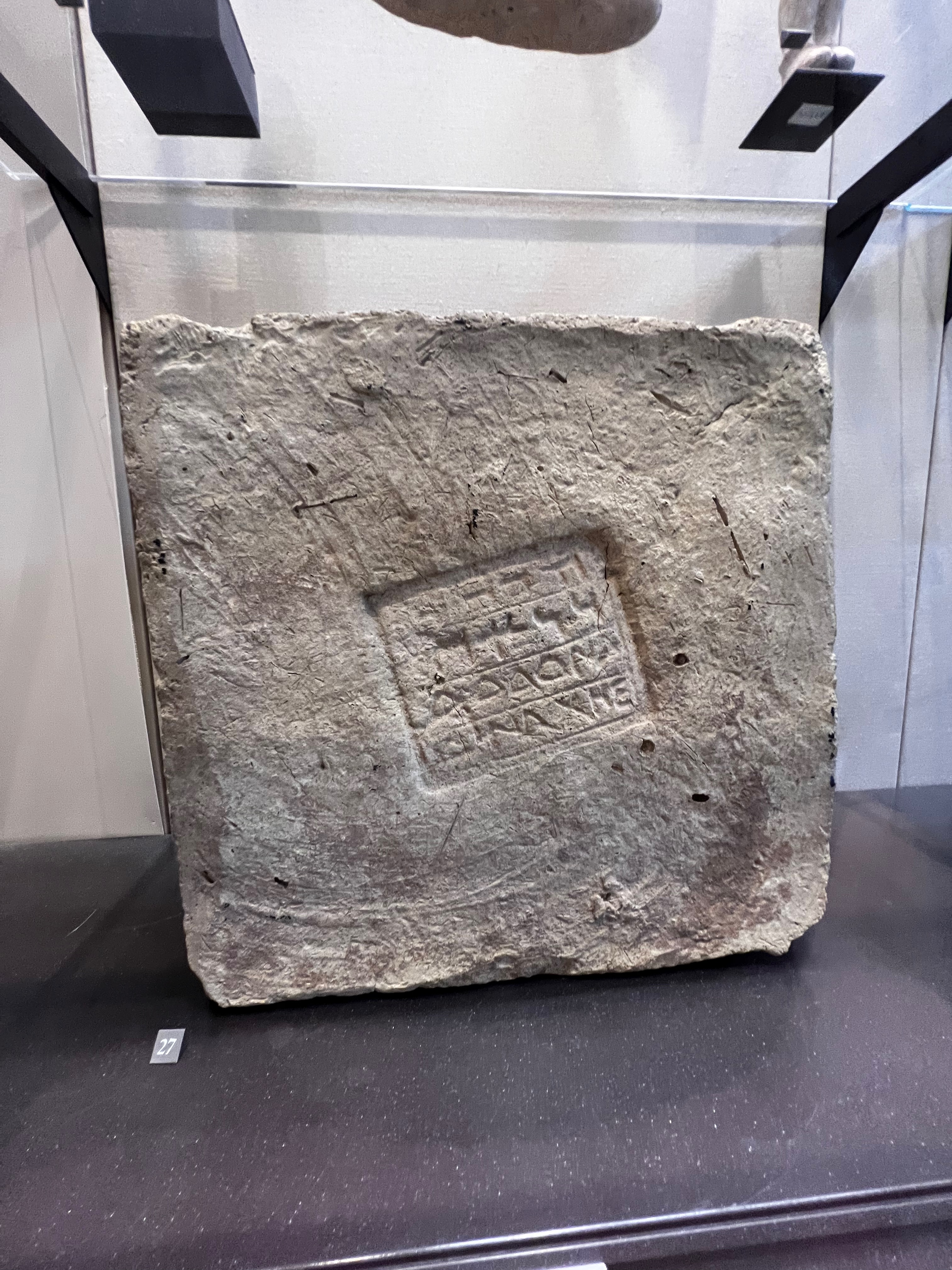
Another angle of AO 29775

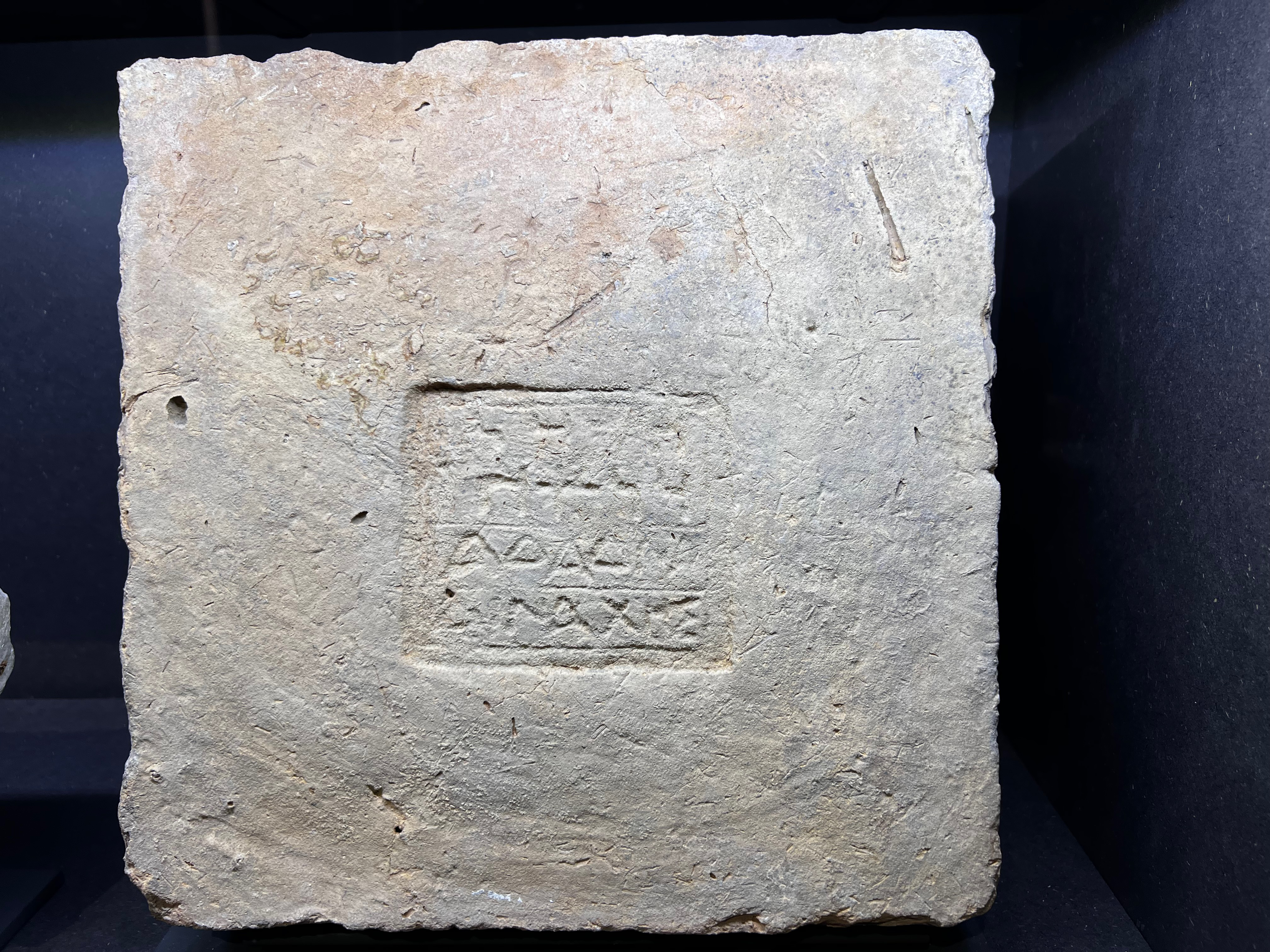
Musée d'archéologie méditerranéenne, Marseille 81

== Bibliography ==
- "Twin temples linked to Hercules and Alexander the Great found by archaeologists in ancient megacity of Girsu, Iraq". Archaeology News Online Magazine.
- "Temple linked to Hercules and Alexander the Great discovered in ancient megacity in Iraq". Live Science..
- Koldewey, Robert (1914). The Excavations at Babylon. Namaskar Books.
- Rey, Sébastien (2024). The Temple of Ningirsu: The Culture of the Sacred in Mesopotamia (PDF). Pennsylvania State University Press. ISBN 978-1-64602-264-9.
- Schrader, Eberhard (1885). "A South-Babylonian Aramaic-Greek Bilingual". Hebraica. Vol. II, no. 1. American Publication Society of Hebrew. ISSN 0160-2810.
- Parrot, André (1948), Tello; vingt campagnes de fouilles (1877-1933)
