= Girsu =

Sumerian city

- Tell Telloh
- Location within Iraq
- 31°33′43.3″N 46°10′39.3″E
- Type: Settlement
- Periods: Ubaid, Uruk, Early Dynastic, Akkadian Empire, Lagash II, Ur III, Isin-Larsa, Hellenistic
- Location: Dhi Qar Province, Iraq
- Region: Sumer

Site notes
- Excavation dates: 1877-1900, 1903-1909, 1929–1933, 2016-Present
- Archaeologists: Ernest de Sarzec, Gaston Cros, Henri de Genouillac, André Parrot, Sébastien Rey

Girsu (Sumerian Ĝirsu. cuneiform ĝir_{2}-su^{ki} 𒄈𒋢𒆠) was a city of ancient Sumer, situated some 25 km (16 mi) northwest of Lagash, at the site of what is now Tell Telloh in Dhi Qar Governorate, Iraq. Because of the initial velar nasal ŋ, the transcription of Ĝirsu is sometimes spelled as Ngirsu (also: G̃irsu, Girsu, Jirsu). As the religious center of the kingdom of Lagash, it contained significant temples to the god Ningirsu (E-ninnu) and his wife Bau and hosted multi-day festivals in their honor.

== History ==
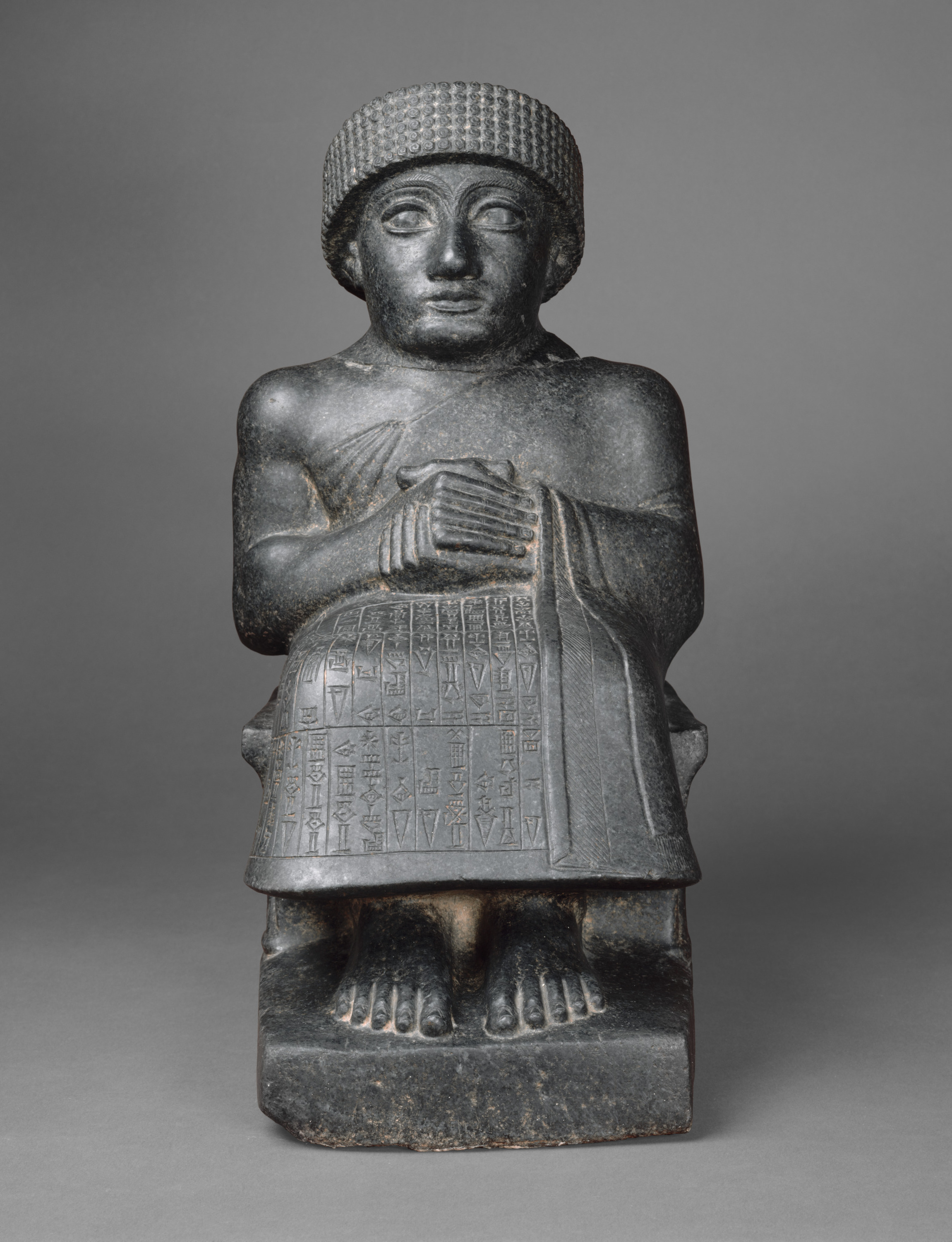
Statue of Gudea, named “Gudea, the man who built the temple, may his life be long”. Metropolitan Museum of Art 59.2.

The city lay on a branch of the ancient Iturungal canal, the southern of two major east west canals in Mesopotamia, that also runs to Niĝin and then to Gu'abba.

"Two effluents took off from the left bank of the Iturungal, the Id-Ninaki-gen-a, which over Bzeikh (Zabalam) flowed to Telloh (Girsu), al Hibba (Uru-ku, Lagas?), and Surghul (Nina) ..."

Radiocarbon dating indicates that the canals running in and through Girsu date back to at least the Early Dynastic I period and went out of use after the Isin-Larsa period (2000–1800 BC).

Girsu was inhabited in the Ubaid 4 (4900-4500 BC) and also the Uruk period (4200-3200 BC), with beveled rim bowls, the diagnostic pottery of that period being found. Significant levels of activity began in the Early Dynastic period (2900-2335 BC). After a brief hiatus occupation resumed in the Early Dynastic I period, continuing during the Akkadian Empire. After the decline of that empire local control of the Girsu/Lagash area was asserted under the Second Dynasty of Lagash. At the time of Gudea, during the Second Dynasty of Lagash, Girsu became the capital of the Lagash kingdom and continued to be its religious center after political power had shifted to the city of Lagash. During the Ur III period, Girsu was a major administrative center for the empire. During the Old Babylonian period Rim-Sîn II, ruler of Larsa c. 1742 BC to 1739 BC (MC), led a rebellion by a number of southern cities against the First Dynasty of Babylon which at that time was led by Samsu-iluna. The rebellious cities included Girsu. First Sealand dynasty, c. 1796–1524 BC (MC), pottery has been found at Girsu. Girsu was then abandoned aropund 1600 BC until occupation resumed in the Hellenistic period Parthian periods before ending around 200 BC. A 4th century BC bilingual Greek/Aramaic inscription was found there.

A few ruler year names mention Girsu, Pirig-me of Lagash II "Year the royal measuring rope of the fields kept in Girsu was brought out", Ur III ruler Shulgi "Year the Ehalbi, (the palace) of the king, was built (in Girsu)", and Larsa ruler Gungunum "Year the canal of Girsu (called) 'Baba is abundance' was dug".

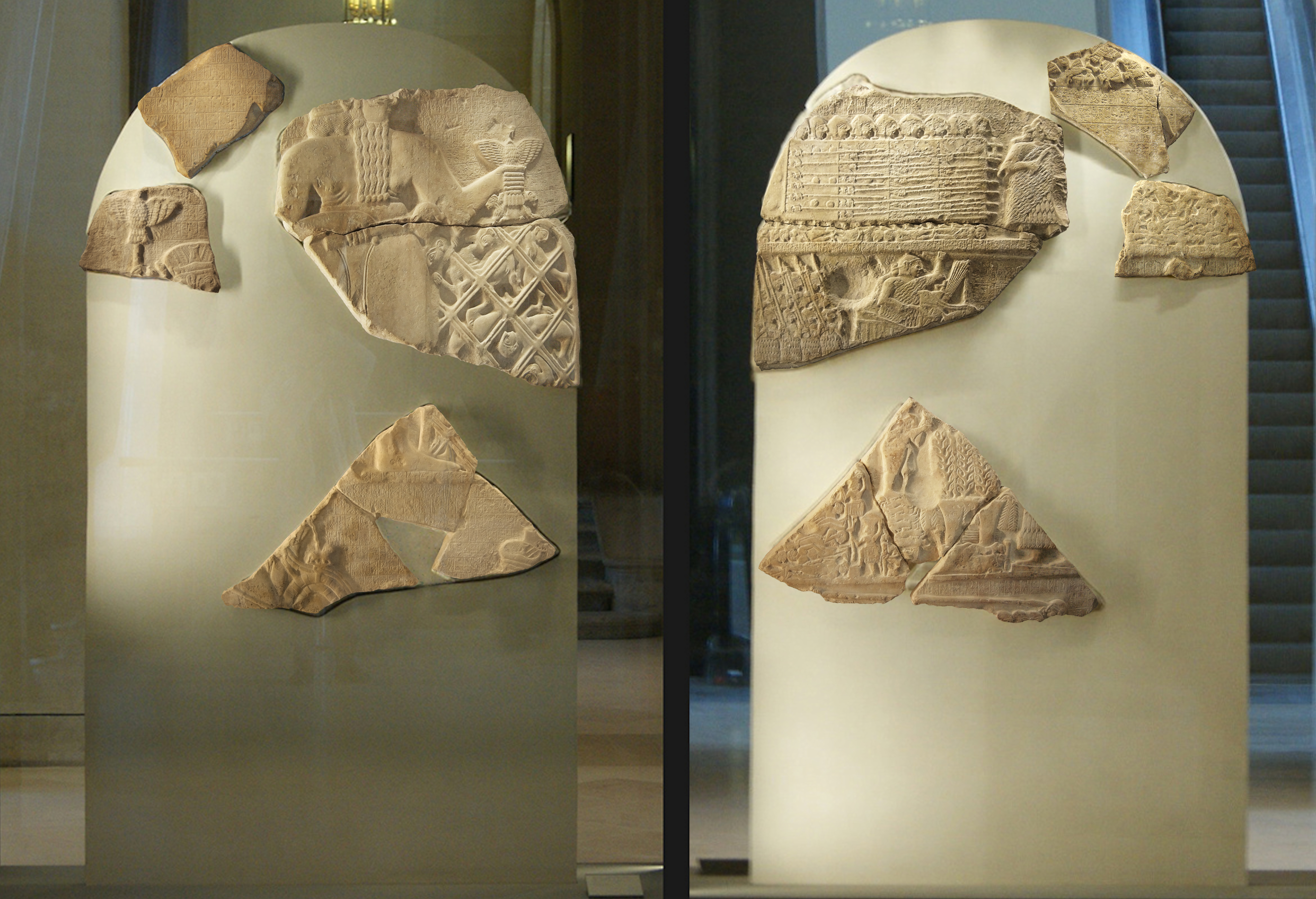
The Stele of the Vultures depicting the god Ningirsu on display at the Louvre Museum.

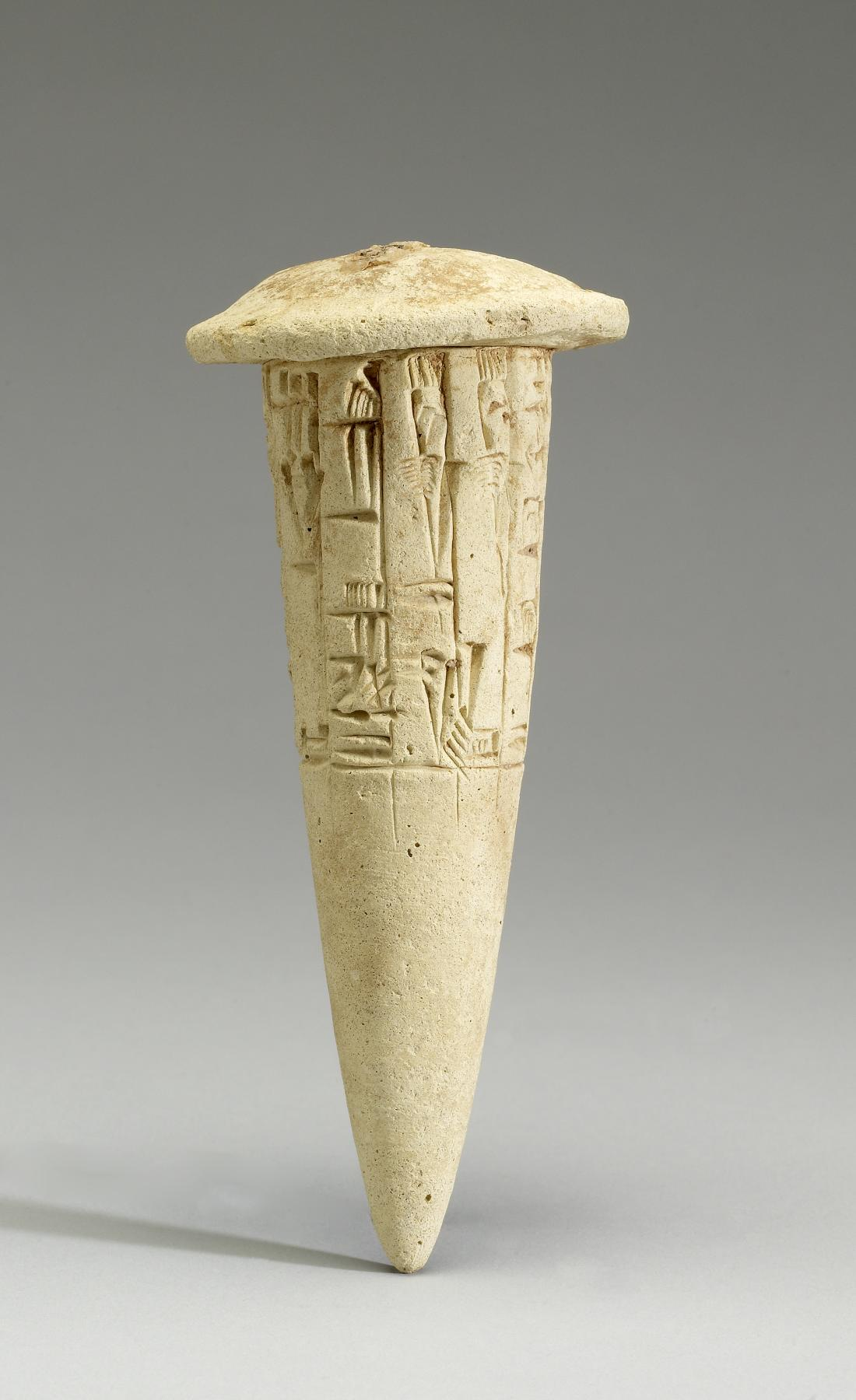
Foundation clay nail of Gudea dedicated to the god Ningirsu. Walters Art Museum 48.1457.

== Archaeology ==
The site consists of two main mounds, one rising 50 feet above the plain and the other 56 feet. Analysis of 1968 CORONOA satellite images indicated the site has an area of about 130 hectares. A number of small mounds dot the site. The mounds are designated Tell A through Tell Y with most of them having little or no archaeological significance. The notable mounds are

- Tell A - Mound of the Palace. Topped by the palace of an obscure Hellenistic period (alternately Aramaic Period) ruler Adad-Nadin-Akhe based on the inscribed Adadnadinakhe bricks. The palace included a number of reused early inscribed diorite statues of Gudea. Modern excavations revealed under it a temple precinct including the E-ninnu temple of Ningirsu
- Tell B - Early Dynastic buildings and tablets
- Tell K - Maison des Fruits, a 10.5 meter by 7.30 meter temple built by Early Dynastic ruler Ur-Nanshe. It was built atop an unidentified earlier construction sealed by a 70 centimeter clay layer which the excavators named the Construction Inférieure. A number of foundation tablets and two inscribed door sockets were found
- Tells L/M - near city wall, temple associated structures and cones
- Tell P - Porte du Diable
- Tell V - Location of the temple of Ningešzida and the area of the site called Tablet Hill as many cuneiform tablets have been found there.

Telloh was the first Sumerian site to be extensively excavated, at first under the French vice-consul at Basra, Ernest de Sarzec, in eleven campaigns between 1877 and 1900. Between excavation seasons the site was subject to extensive looking and an estimated 35 to 40 thousand cuneiform tablets entered the antiquities market. He was followed by his successor Gaston Cros from 1903–1909. All finds were divided between the Archaeological Museum of Istanbul and the Louvre Museum in Paris, Finds included an alabaster statue of a woman, with copper bracelets coated in gold and a fragment of a stone lion carved dish with a partial Sumerian inscription. In 1879 the site was visited by Hormuzd Rassam. Also found were two steatite statue portions (AO 00036 + Ist EŞEM 00438) with inscriptions by the Ur III ruler Shulgi dedicated to the local god Igalim.

Excavations continued under Abbé Henri de Genouillac in 1929–1931 and under André Parrot in 1931–1933. It was at Girsu that the fragments of the Stele of the Vultures were found. The site has suffered from poor excavation standards and also from illegal excavations. About 50,000 cuneiform tablets have been recovered from the site. Cueniform tablets from this excavation were shared between the Louvre and the Iraq Museum. Cueniform tablets were held in the Louvre for 24 months for study then sent to the Iraq Museum and most remain unpublished.

Excavations at Telloh resumed in 2016 as part of a training program for Iraqi archaeologists organized by the British Museum. A foundation tablet and a number of inscribed building cones have been found. In the 5th season, in autumn 2019, work concentrated on the Mound of the Palace (Tell A) where E-ninnu, a temple to Ningirsu, had been found in earlier seasons. In March 2020, archaeologists announced the discovery of a 5,000-year-old cultic area filled with more than 300 broken ceremonial ceramic cups, bowls, jars, animal sacrifices, and ritual processions dedicated to Ningirsu. One of the remains was a duck-shaped bronze figurine with eyes made from bark which is thought to be dedicated to Nanshe. An Indus Valley weight was also found. In 2022 excavators moved their operation to Tablet Hill (Tell V ). In February 2023, archaeologists from British Museum and Getty Museum revealed the remains of the 4,500 year-old Sumerian Lord Palace of the Kings alongside more than 200 cuneiform tablets containing administrative records of Girsu. Most of the inscribed objects were broken and findspots were in the French spoil heap and in construction fill. The E-ninnu temple (Temple of the White Thunderbird), the primary sanctuary of the Sumerian warrior god Ningirsu was also identified during the excavations. In the 2024 season 200 cuneiform tablets (including school texts) and 60 clay sealings from the Akkadian Empire period were found. Sealings include one which said "Naram-Sin, the mighty, god of Akkad, king of the four quarters (of the world): Lugal-ushumgal, the scribe, governor, your servant". A number of the interpretations of the current excavators have been challenged.

Along with archaeology the site is also being stabilized, required after the early excavations and looting, and prepared for tourism.

In 2023, British Museum experts have suggested the possibility that a Hellenistic shrine at Girsu was founded by Alexander the Great, built atop the ruins of E-ninnu. According to the researchers, recent discoveries suggest that "this site honours Zeus and two divine sons. The sons are Heracles and Alexander."

== Anzagar ==
Referred to as Anzagar-Umma (An-za-gar_{3}-Umma^{ki}). An-za-gar_{3} translates to "fortified village" and there were a number of similar toponyms in the region, such as An-za-gar_{3}-giškiri_{6}-Zabalam_{4}^{ki}, An-za-gar_{3}-a-šag_{4}-La_{2}-mah, An-za-gar_{3}-Da-da, and An-za_{3}-gar_{3}-Nig_{2}-ul-pa-e_{3}. The 27th year name of Babylon ruler Sumulael was "Year the city walls of Kutha and Anzagar-urgi were built". It is thought to have been on the eastern border of the Ur III Umma province border with the Girsu-Lagash province. It is known to have been on a canal (possibly the Udaga canal and/or Namhani canal) based on a text reading "during three days, floated the boats from Anzagar-Umma to Girsu, (and) towed the boats from Girsu to Garšana", In another shipping text merchanise from Garšana was towed up the Udaga canal to the junction with the Namhani canal at Anzagar and then floated down to Girsu on that canal. In the Ur III period a transportation and messenger resthouse, é-kas_{4} An-za-gàr I_{7} Gir-su^{ki}, was established in Anzagar similar to those established in nearby Gu'abba and Kinunir. Anzagar is known to have been a transit point on the route from Ur to Anshan.

Anzagar lay near to Kesh, Diniktum and to Irisaĝrig. Tell al-Wilayah has been suggested as a location. It held a temple of Ninegal and shrines or sanctuaries of Ninḫursaĝ, PAP.NAGAR, Nergal, Allātum, and Inanna. It is known that there was a sacristy, for storing jewels etc, at the temple of Allatum at Anzagar.

== Gallery ==
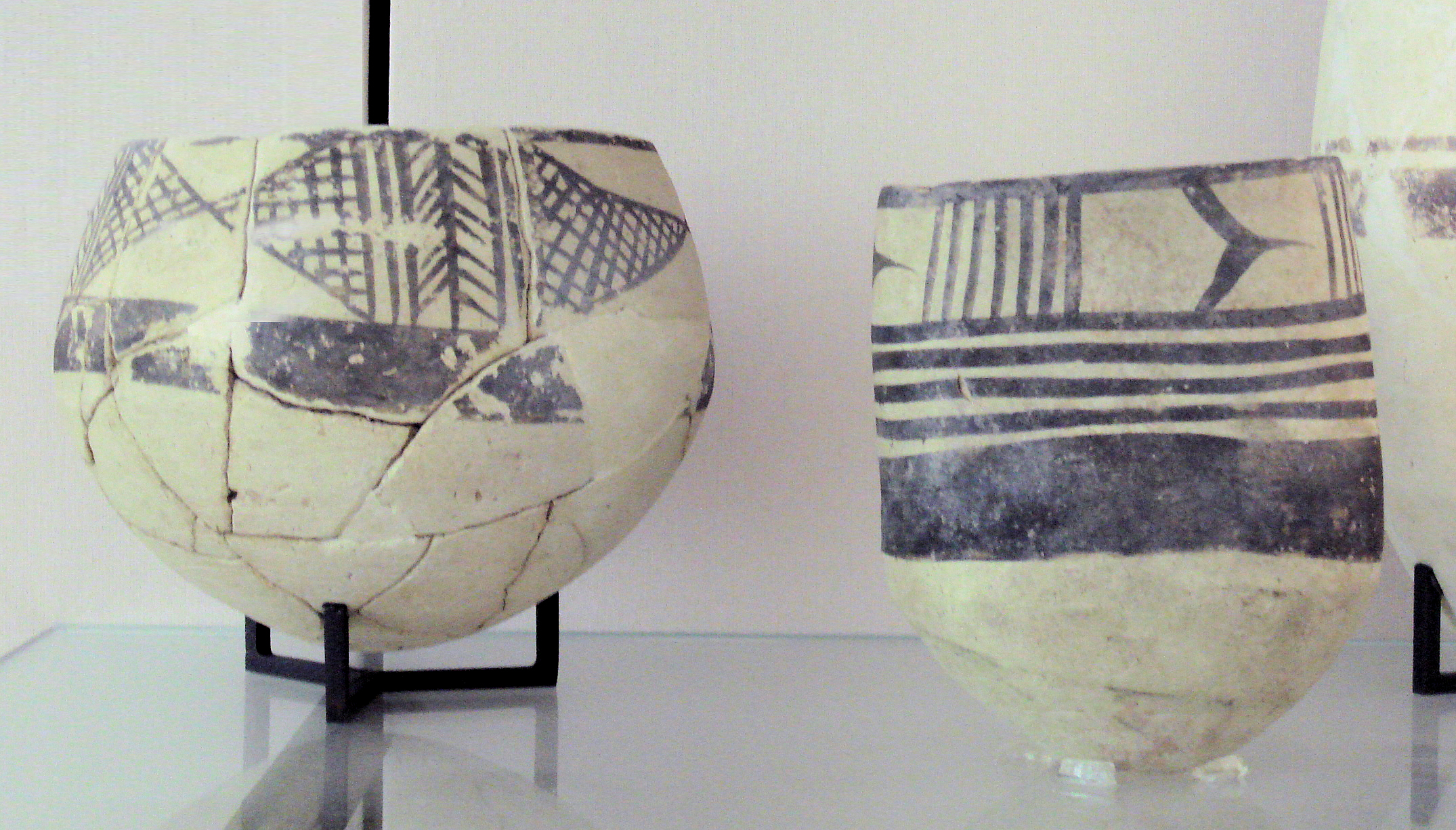
Ubaid IV pottery jars, ca. 4700–4200 BC. From Girsu, Louvre Museum.

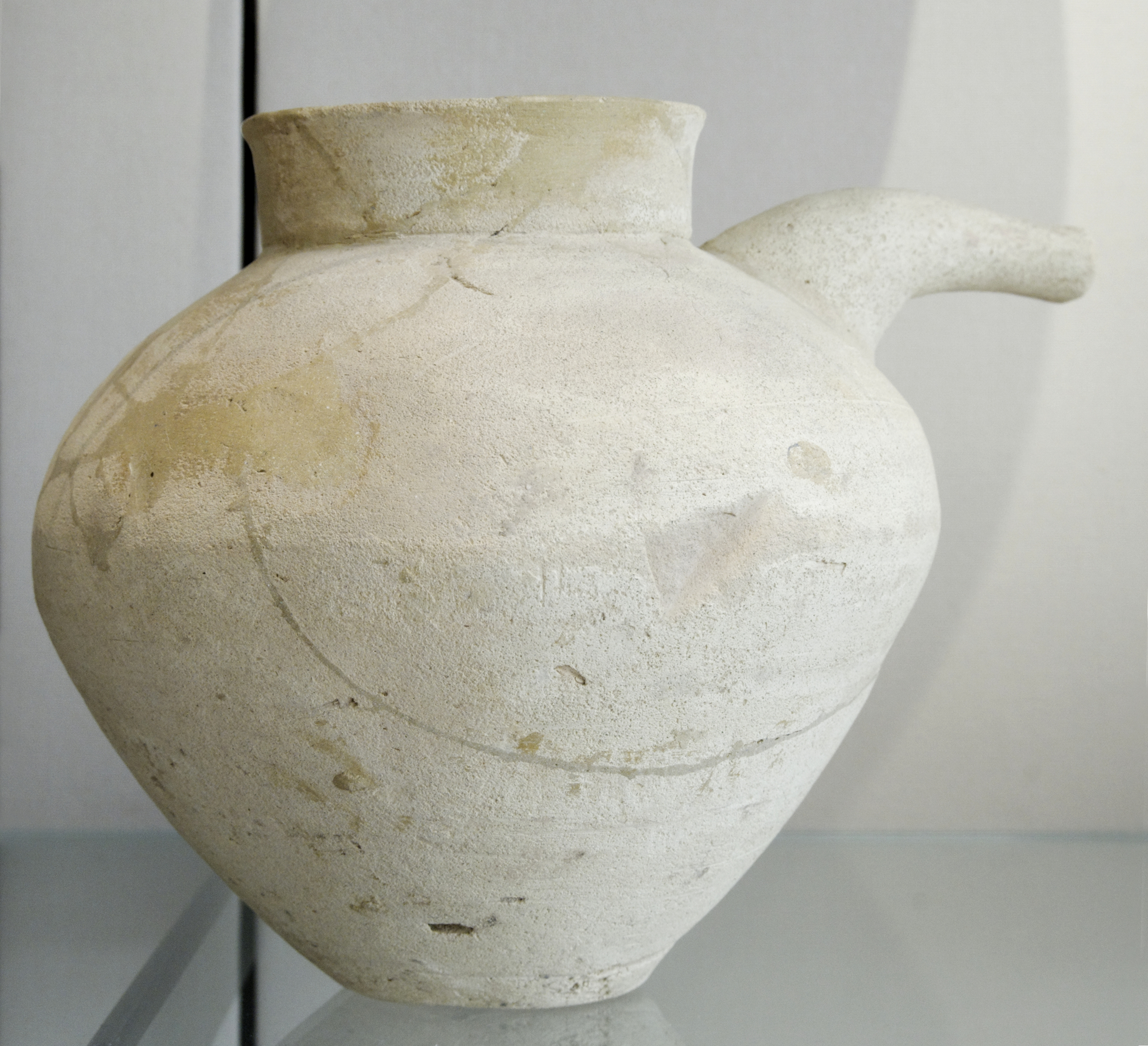
Uruk Period terracotta vase, ca. 3500–2900 BC. From Girsu, Louvre Museum AO14313.

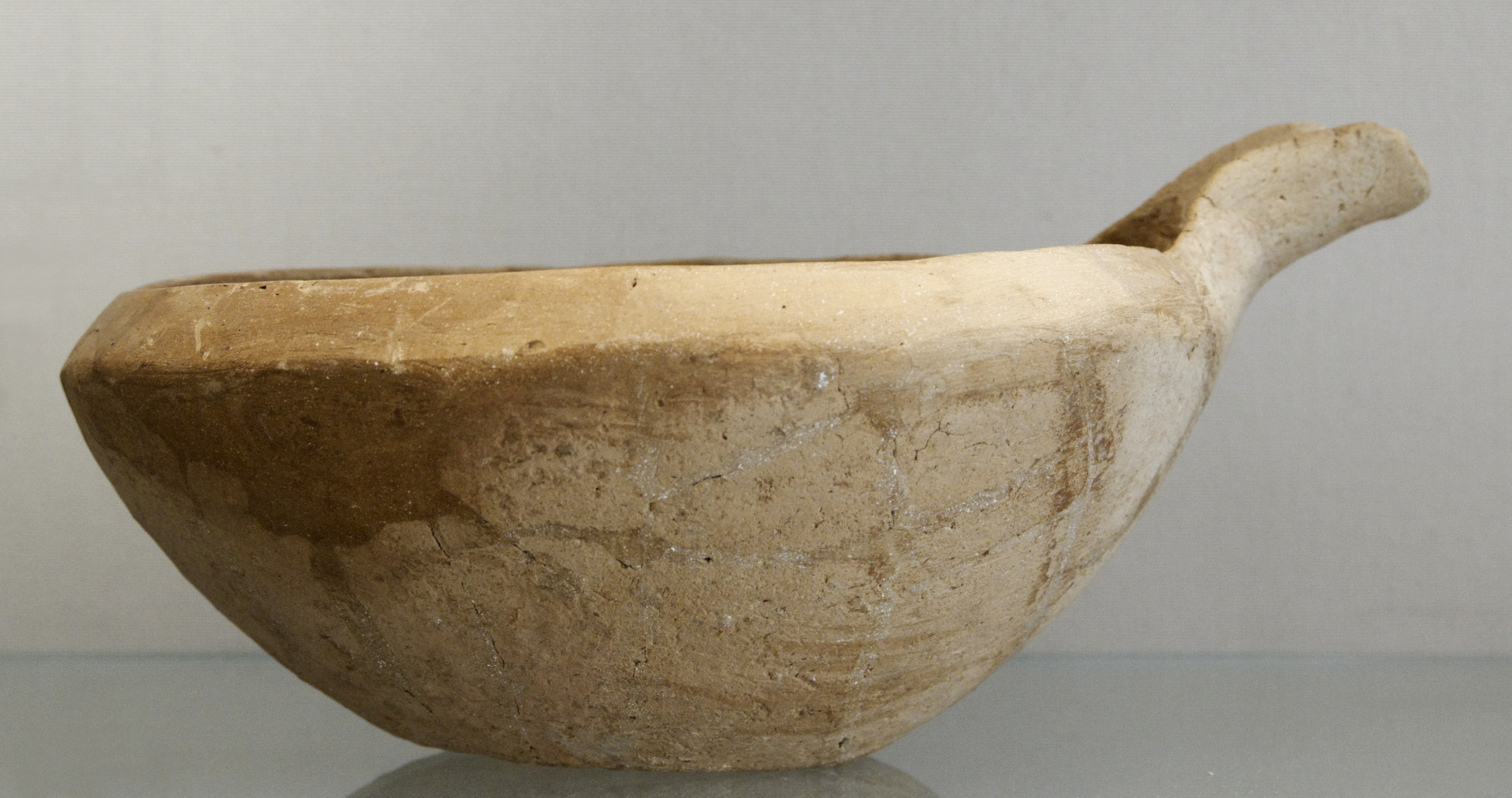
Terracotta vase, ca. 3500–2900 BC. From Girsu, Louvre Museum AO14342

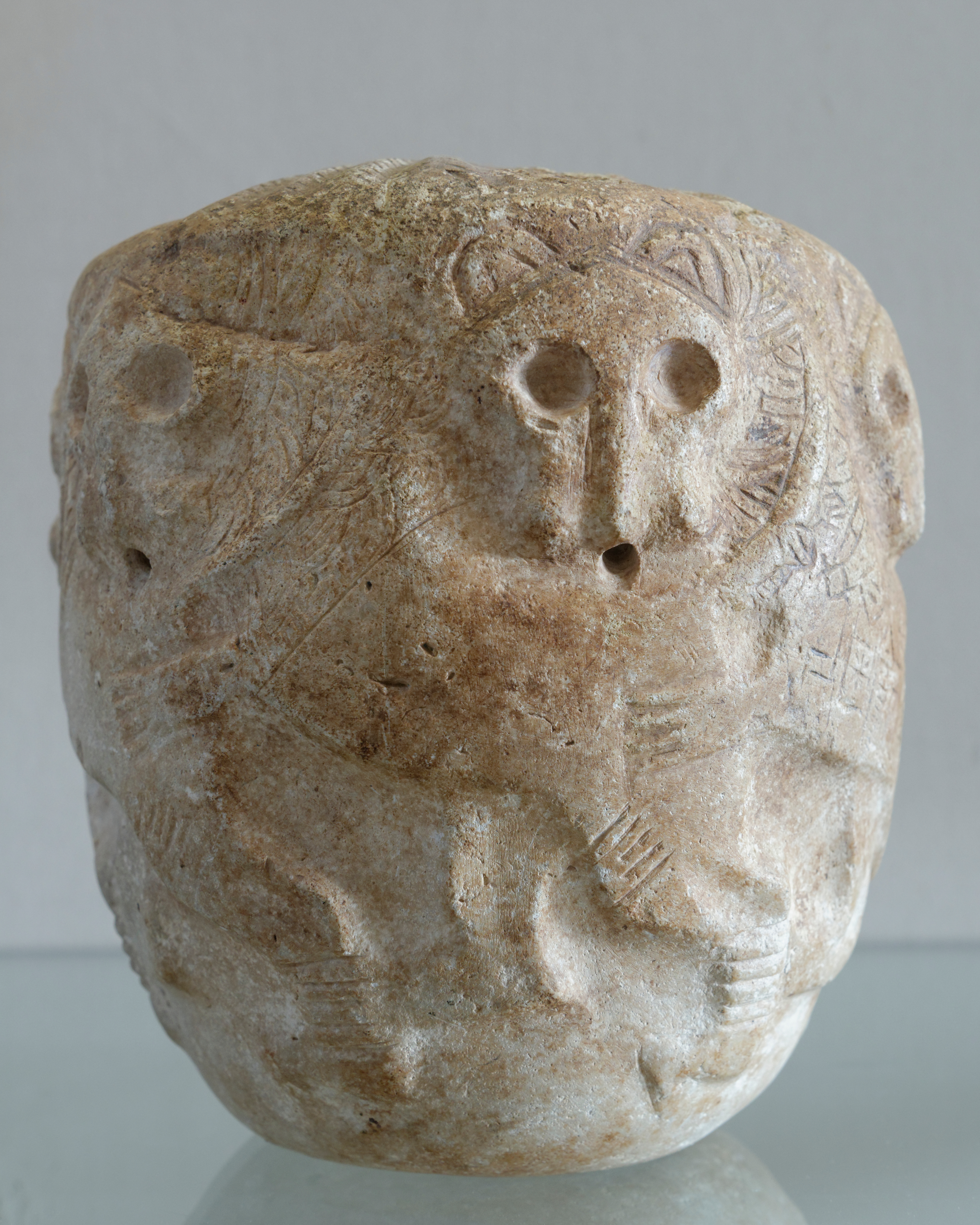
The Mace of Mesilim, c. 2550 BC. From Girsu, Louvre Museum AO2349.

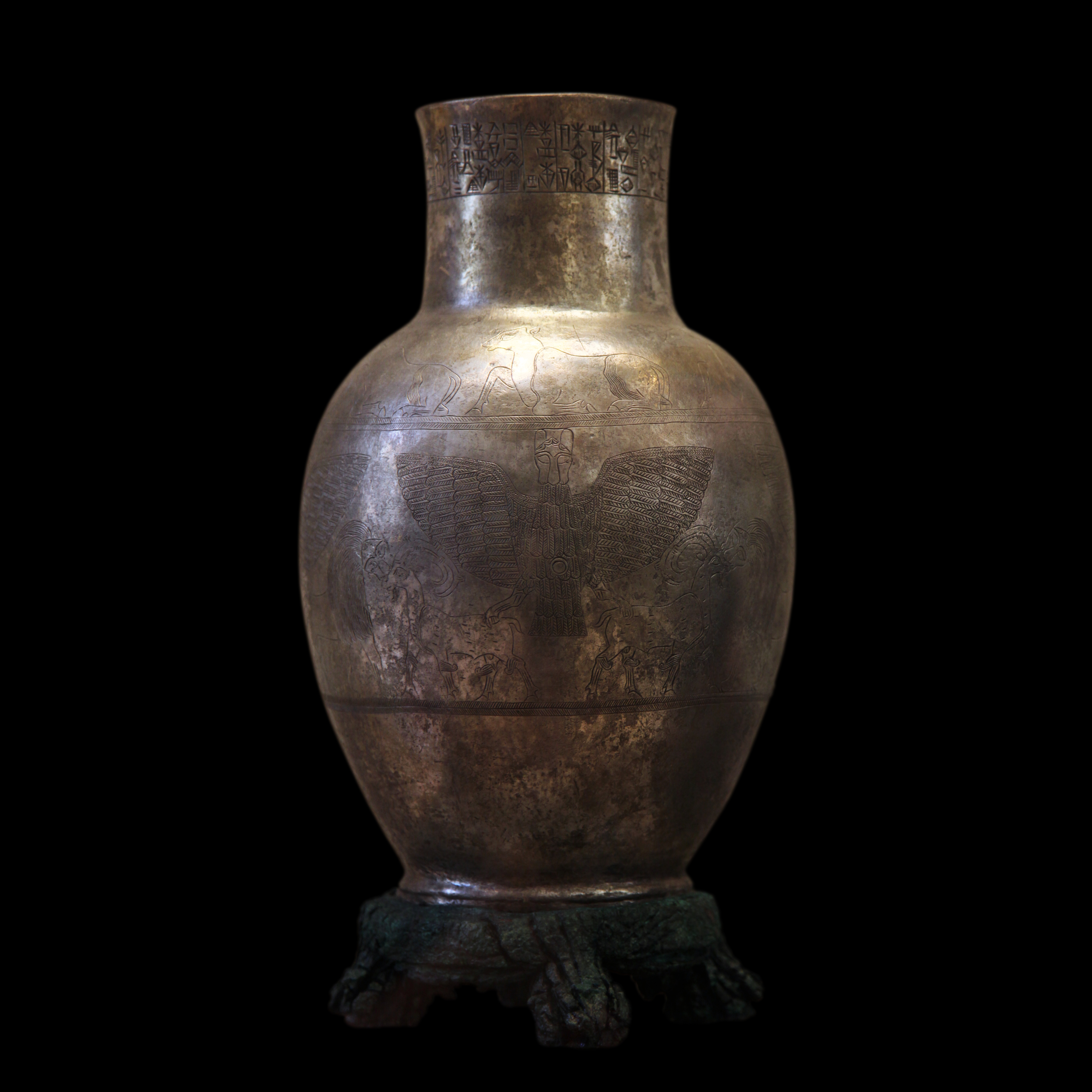
The Silver Vase of Enmetena, 2420–2400 BC. From Girsu, Louvre Museum AO2674.

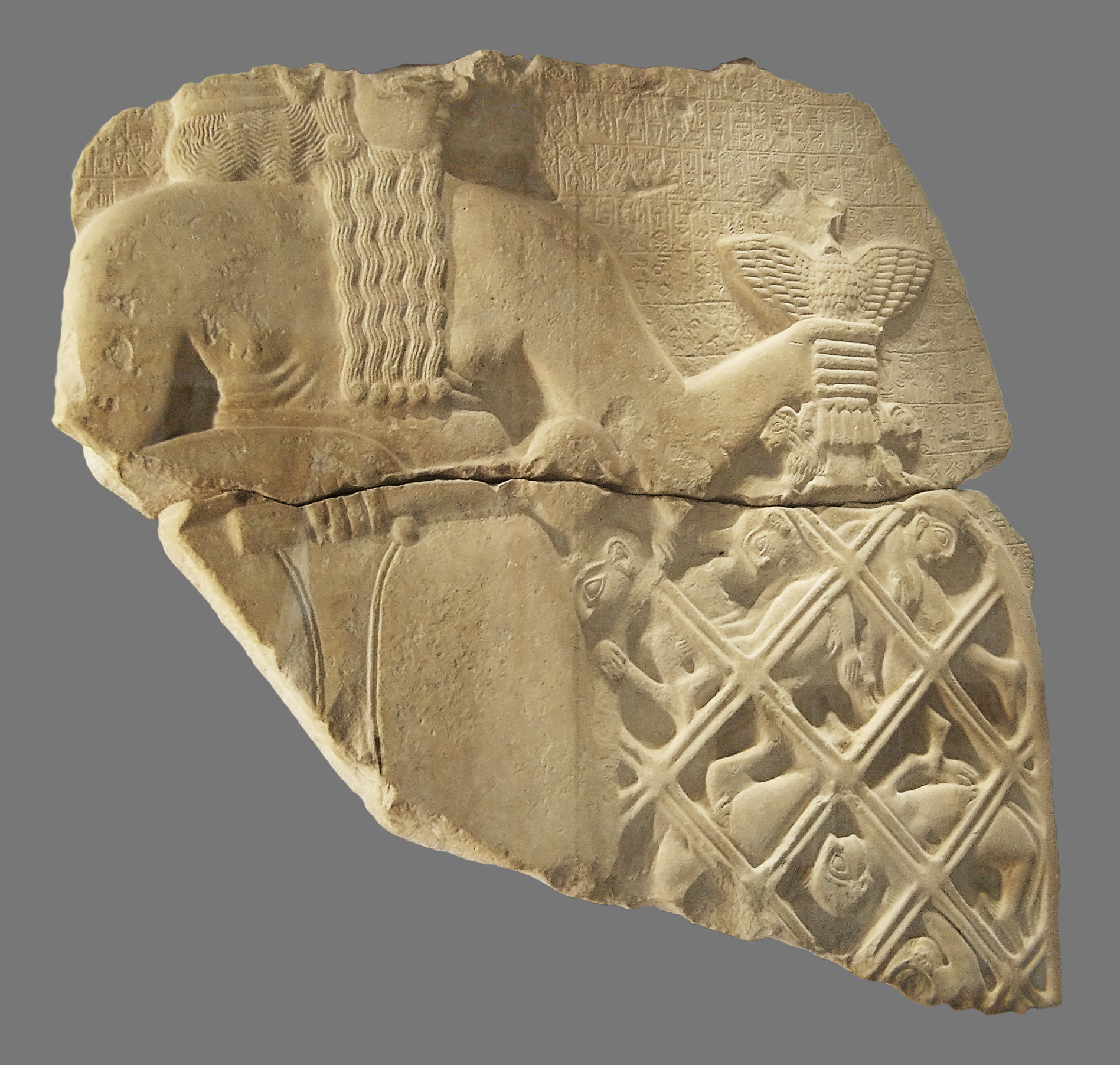
Depiction of the god Ningirsu in the Stele of the Vultures, 2450–2425 BC. From Girsu, Louvre Museum.

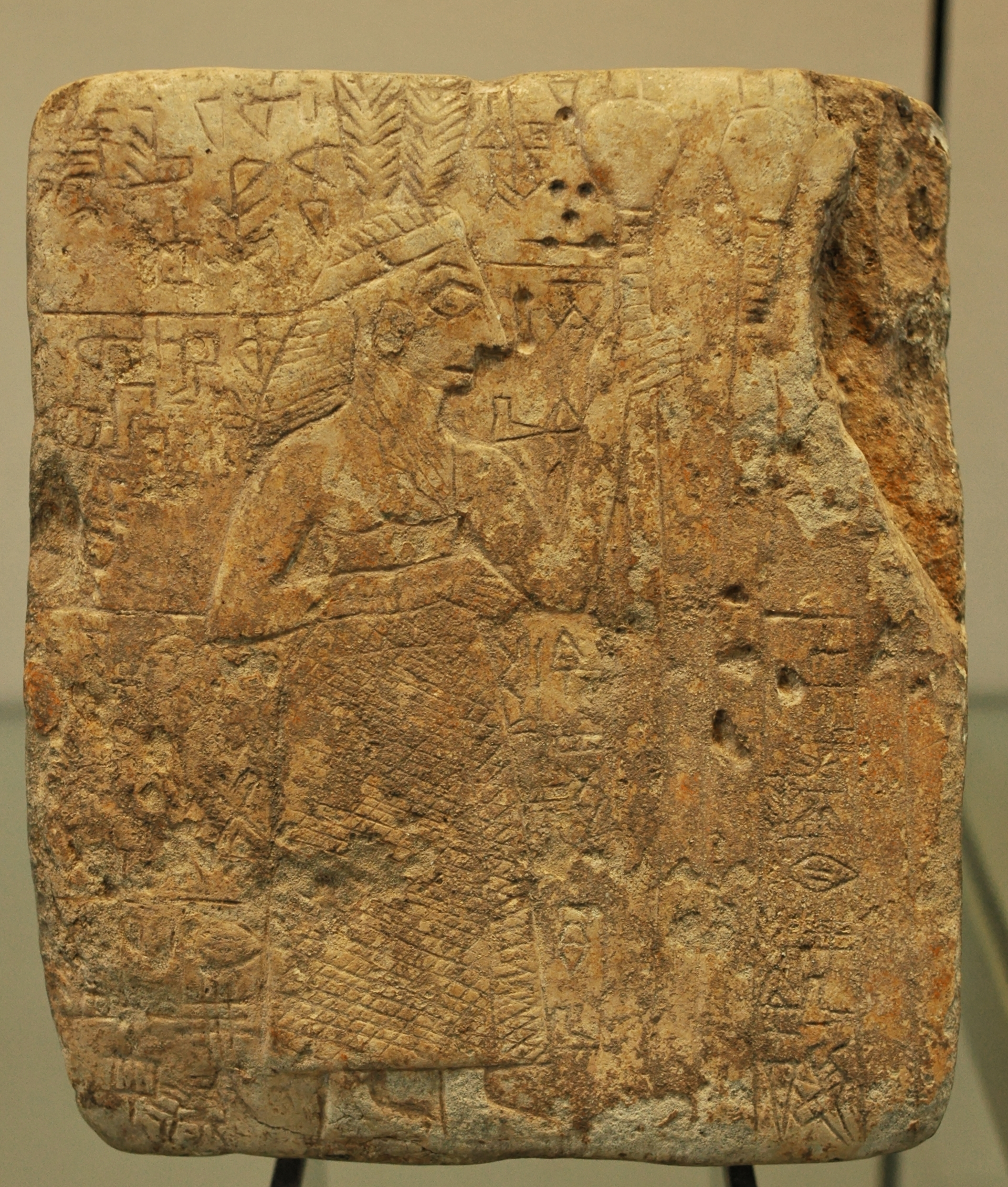
The Feathered Figure, 2700–2600. From Girsu, Louvre Museum AO221.

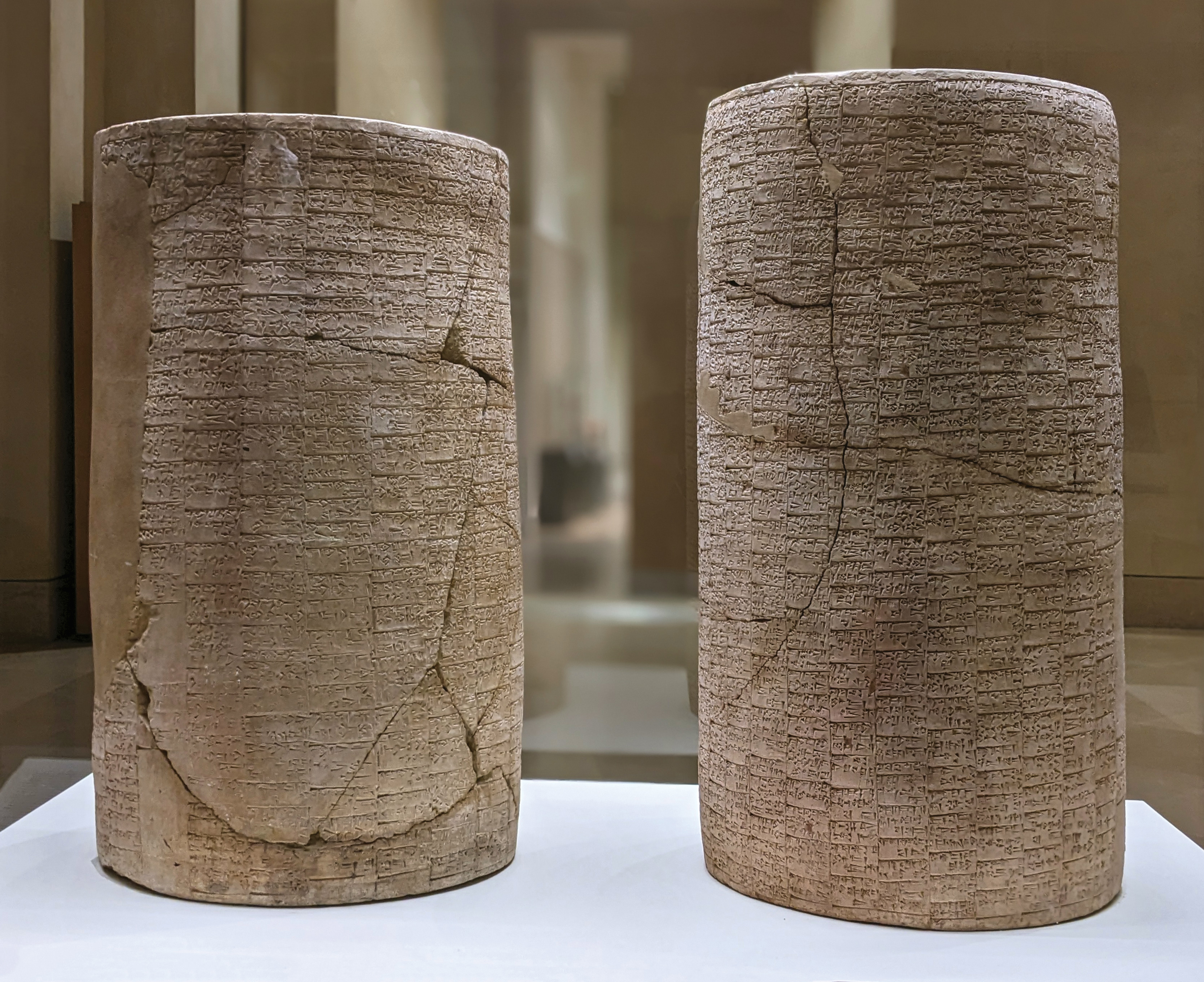
The Cylinders of Gudea. Musée du Louvre, MNB1512 and MNB1511.

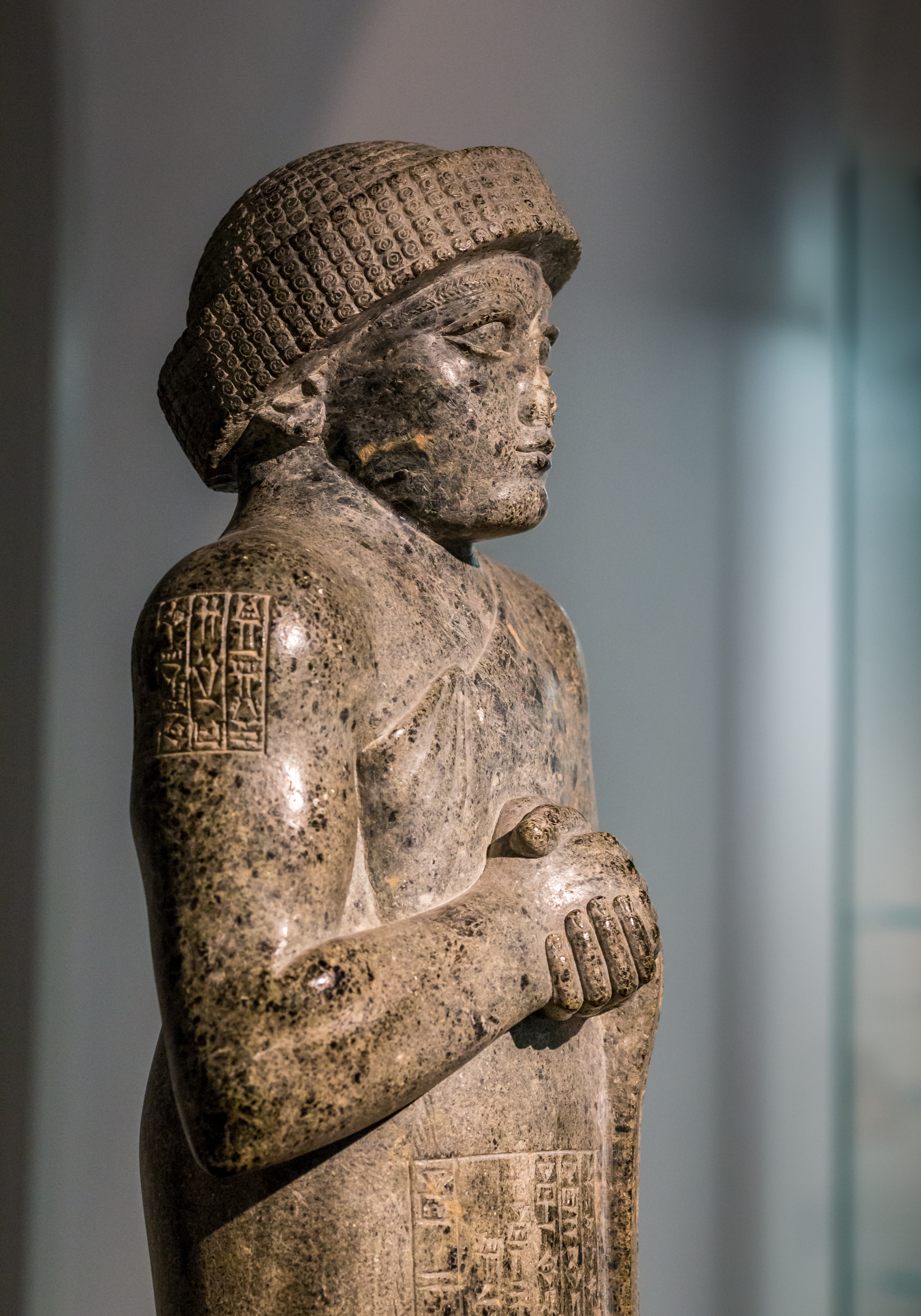
Statue of Gudea, Statue O. Ny Carlsberg Glyptotek, NCG 840

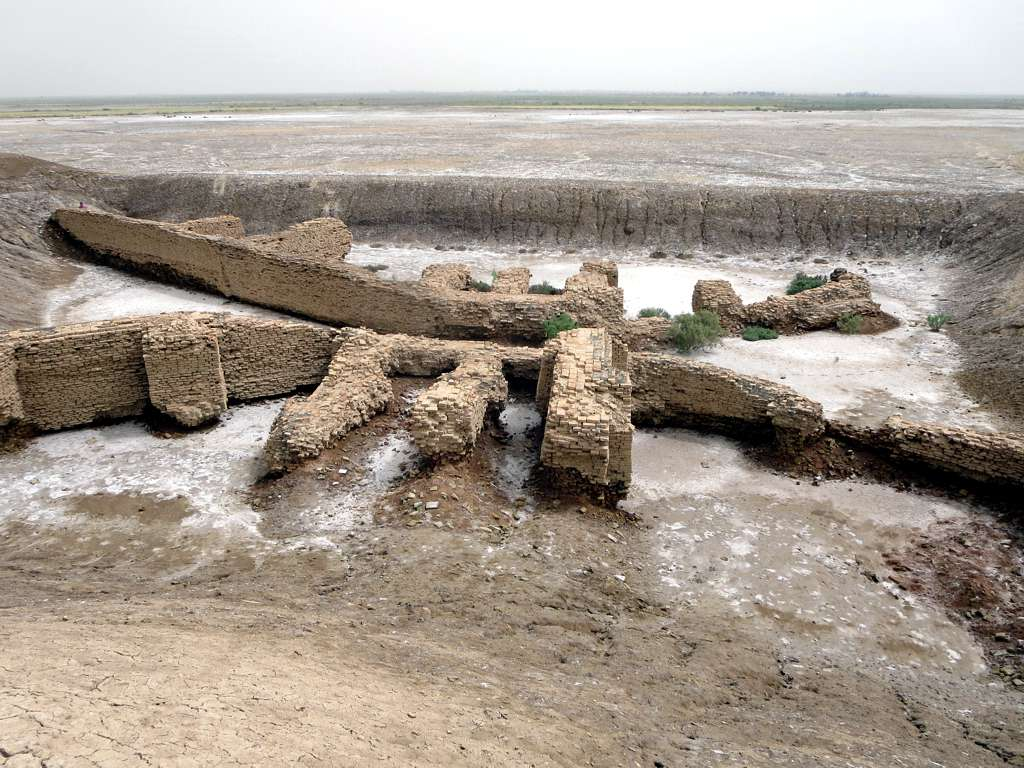
Archaeological remains of the Bridge of Girsu

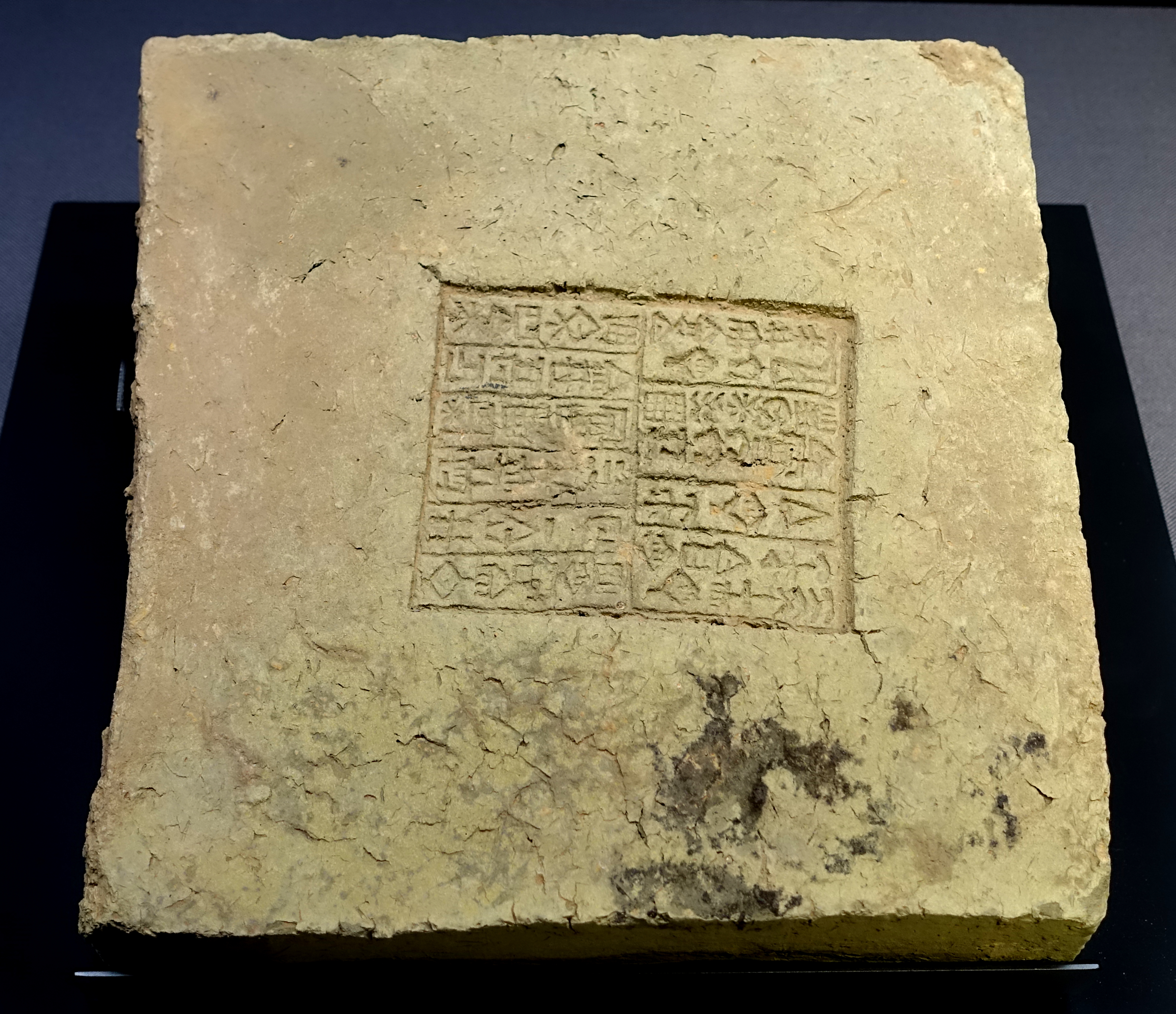
Gudea brick with a stamped inscription commemorating the construction of the Temple of Ningirsu

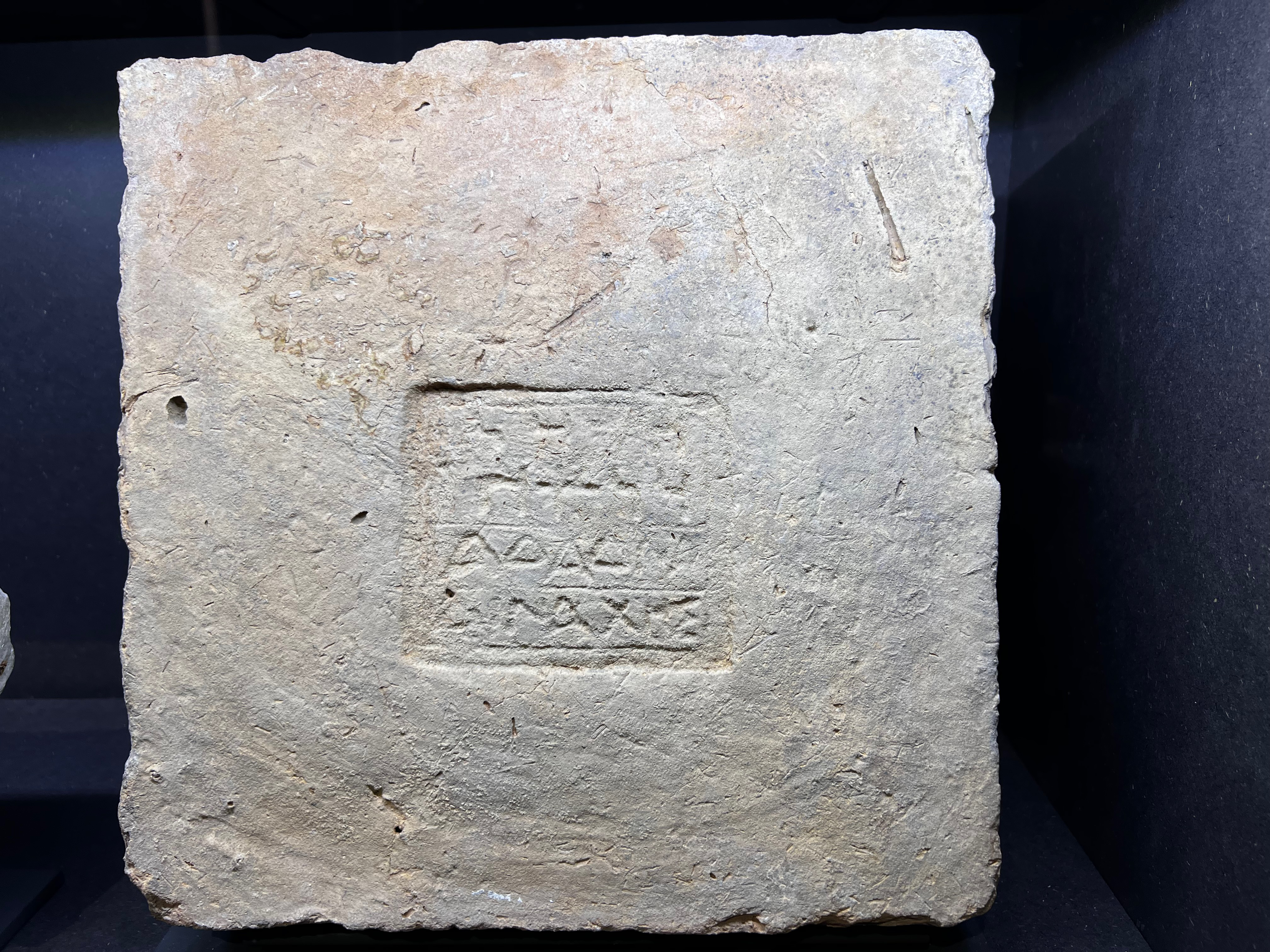
Brick stamped in the name of Adadnadinakhe. Musée d'archéologie méditerranéenne, Marseille

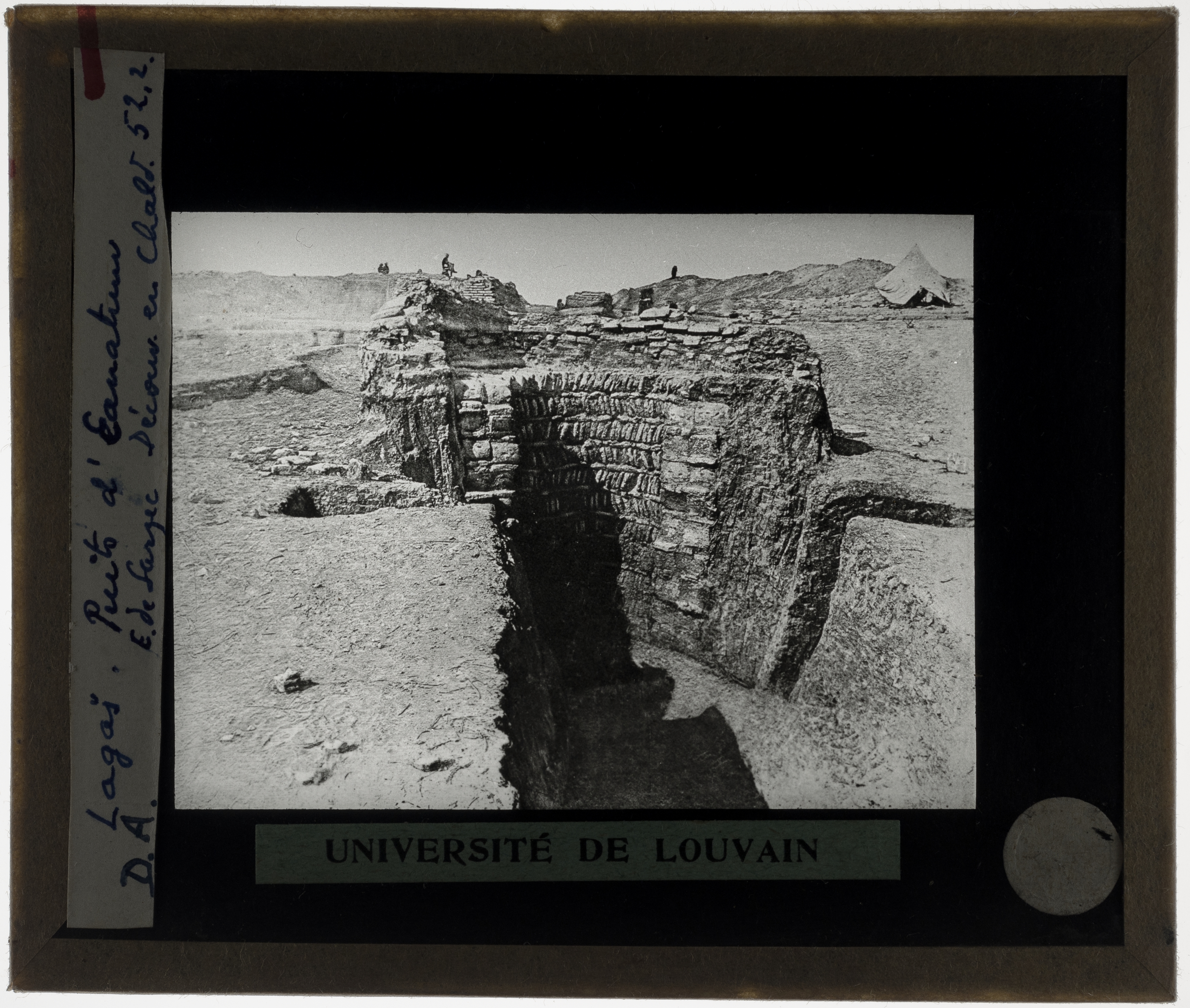
The Well of Eanatum

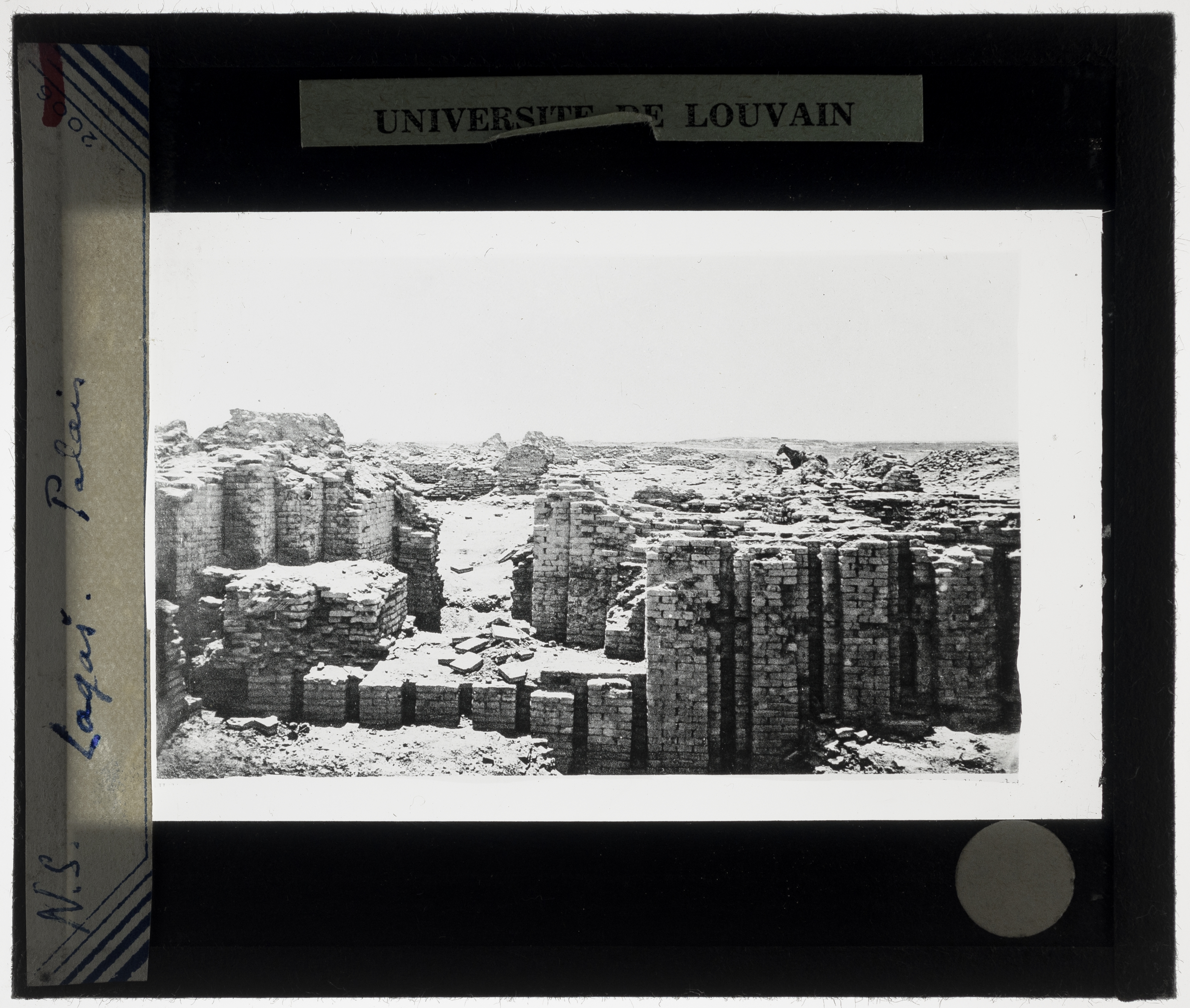
View of the Gate of Gudea (1988).

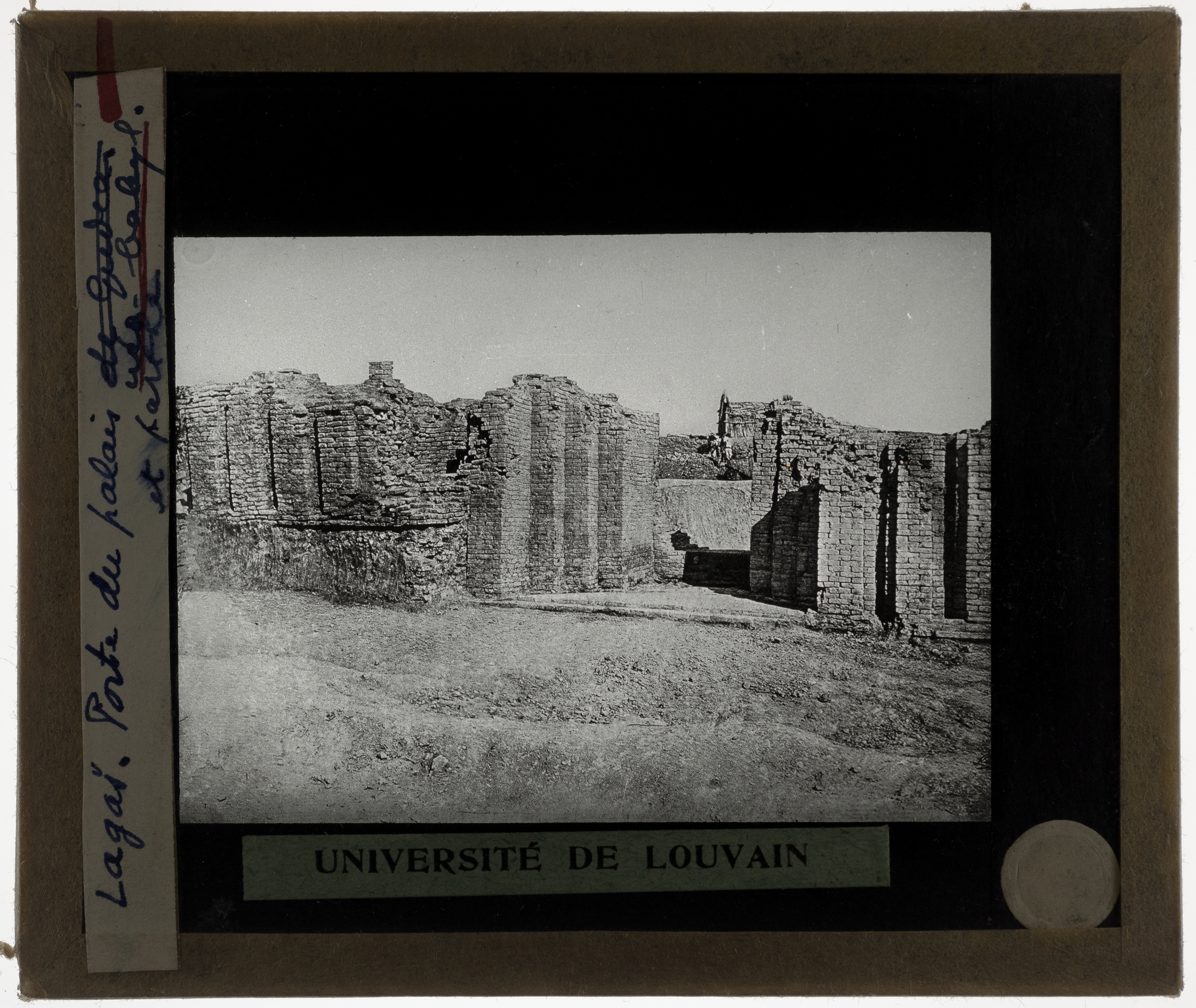
The Gate of Gudea completely exposed (1895)

== See also ==
- Cities of the ancient Near East
- Garšana
- Gu'abba
- List of Mesopotamian deities
- List of Mesopotamian dynasties
- Niĝin
- Umma–Lagash war
