= Henri de Genouillac =

French Roman Catholic priest, epigrapher and archaeologist (1881-1940)

Henri Pierre Louis du Verdier de Genouillac, called Abbé Henri de Genouillac, (15 March 1881, Rouen – 20 November 1940, in his clergy house in Villennes-sur-Seine) was a French Roman Catholic priest, epigrapher and archaeologist specializing in Assyriology.

== Biography ==
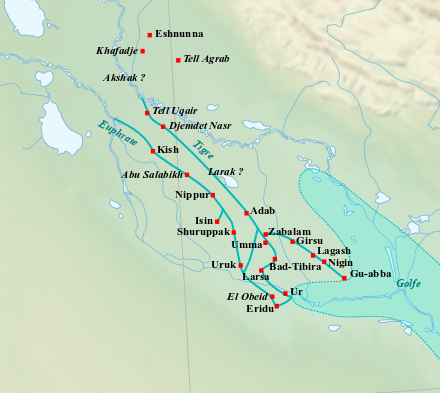
Archaeological sites in Mesopotamia

Henri de Genouillac was the son Casimir Charles Victor du Verdier, vicomte de Genouillac, a chevalier of the Légion d'honneur and Léontine Marc.

He made an impression among Assyriologists when he published Tablettes sumériennes archaïques in 1909. Gaston Maspero made a lengthy review of the work in the Journal des débats dated 30 March 1909. In 1911, he published La Trouvaille de Dréhem. He was sent to Constantinople and brought back the volumes of the Inventaire des tablettes de Tello (1912–1921). In 1912, he published the Textes économiques d'Oumma, then in 1930, the Textes religieux sumériens du Louvre.

A researcher at the Département des antiquités orientales du musée du Louvre, he was given the direction of the excavations at Kish between January and April 1912, allowing him to write the two volumes of the Fouilles françaises d'El-'Akhymer (1924–1925).

In 1926 he published Céramique cappadocienne.

He was given the resumption of excavations on the site of Tello in 1929. The objects out clandestine excavations showed that all had not yet been discovered. There, he directed three excavation campaigns until 1931. After that, he considered his health did not allow him to keep going and handed André Parrot the direction of excavations. Returning to France, he wrote Fouilles de Telloh (1934–1936).

He bequeathed to the musée départemental des antiquités of Seine-Maritime in Rouen his collection of 620 objects, which were received into the museum on May 17, 1941.

=== Publications ===
- Premières recherches à Kish (1911–1912)
- Fouilles de Telloh. Mission archéologique du Musée du Louvre et du Ministère de l'Instruction Publique. Tome II : Époques d'Ur, IIIe dynastie et de Larsa
- L'Église chrétienne au temps de saint Ignace d'Antioche, G. Beauchesne, 1907; p. 268
- Tablettes sumériennes archaïques: matériaux pour servir à l'histoire de la société sumérienne, P. Geuthner, 1909; p. 122
- Textes de l'époque d'Agadé et de l'époque d'Ur: fouilles d'Ernest de Sarzec en 1894, E. Leroux, 1910; p. 66
- La Trouvaille de Dréhem: étude avec un choix de textes de Constantinople et Bruxelles, P. Geuthner, 1911; p. 20
- Textes cunéiformes. Textes économiques d'oumma de l'époque d'Our, 1921
- Fouilles françaises d'El-'Akhymer : premières recherches archéologiques à Kich (1911–1912), Volumes 1 et 2, É. Champion, 1924
- (in collab. with André Parrot, Roman Ghirshman, H. Walbert, M. Gardinier, P. Pruvost, J. Lacam), Fouilles de Telloh, P. Geuthner, 1934

== Bibliography ==
- André Parrot, "Henri de Genouillac", p. 299-300, in Syria, year 1941, n°22-3-4 Persée
