= Mondement-Montgivroux =

- Commune
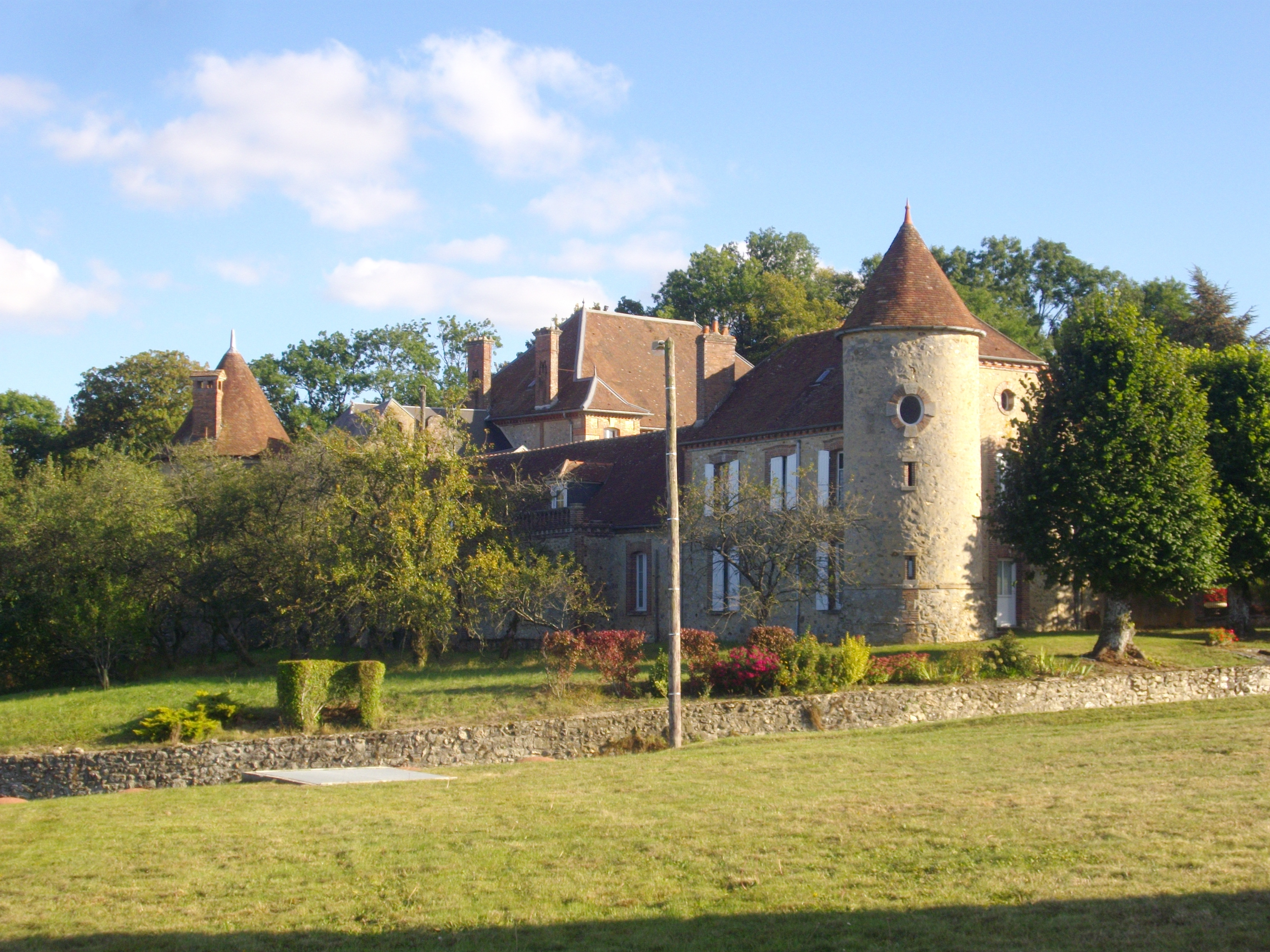
- The chateau in Mondement
- Location of Mondement-Montgivroux
- Location within France Location within Grand Est
- Coordinates: 48°47′17″N 3°46′43″E
- Country: France
- Region: Grand Est
- Department: Marne
- Arrondissement: Épernay
- Canton: Sézanne-Brie et Champagne

Government
  - Mayor (2020–2026): Olivier Dufour
- Area^{1}: 7.37 km^{2} (2.85 sq mi)
- Elevation: 215 m (705 ft)
- Population (2023): 29
  - Density: 3.9/km^{2} (10/sq mi)
- Time zone: UTC+01:00 (CET)
  - Summer (DST): UTC+02:00 (CEST)
- INSEE/Postal code: 51374 /51120
- ^{1} French Land Register data, which excludes lakes, ponds, glaciers > 1 km^{2} (0.386 sq mi or 247 acres) and river estuaries.

Mondement-Montgivroux (French pronunciation: [mɔ̃dmɑ̃ mɔ̃ʒivʁu]) is a commune in the Marne department in north-eastern France.

== See also ==
- Communes of the Marne department
