= Ernest de Sarzec =

French diplomat and archaeologist

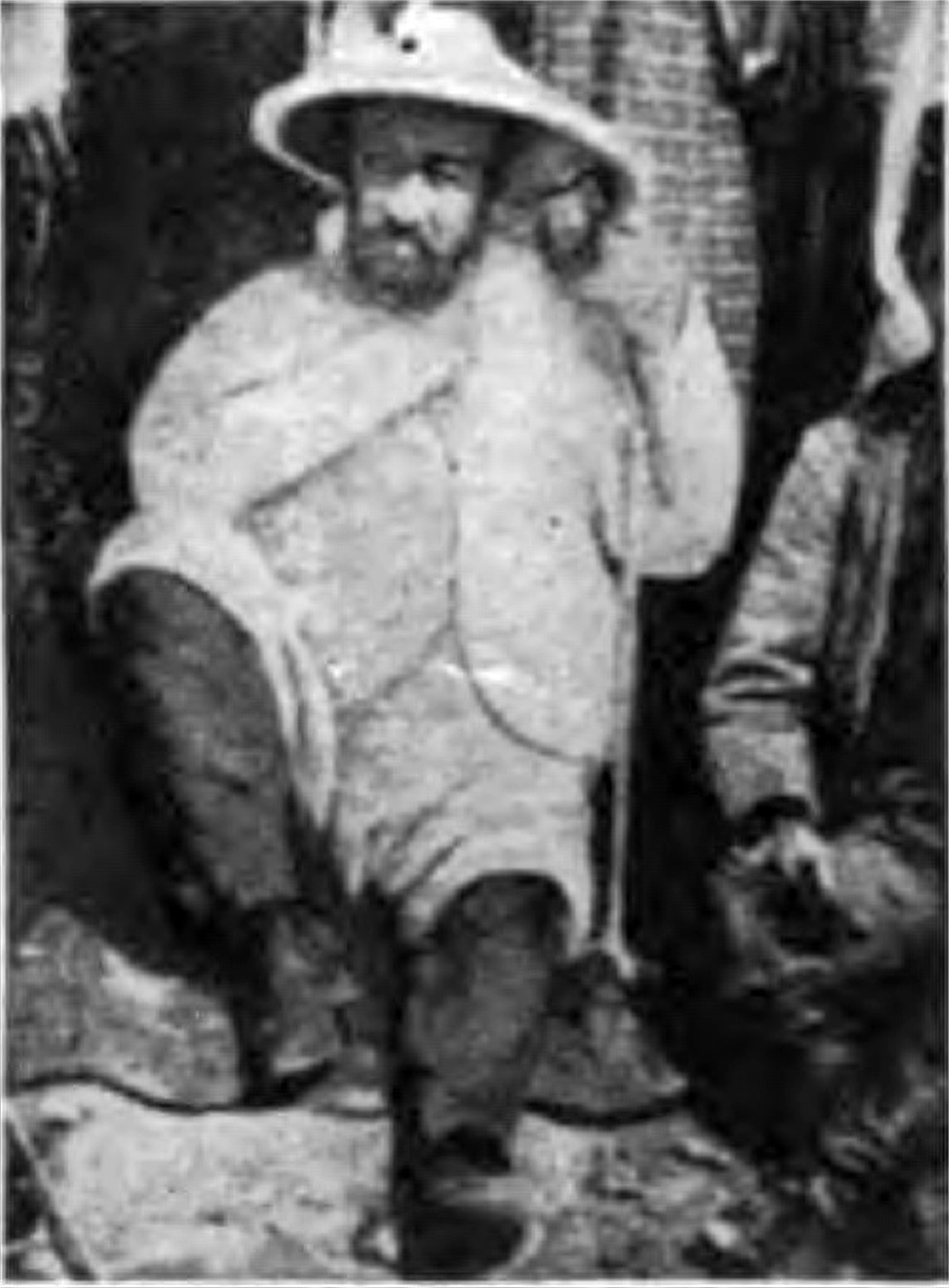
Ernest de Sarzec

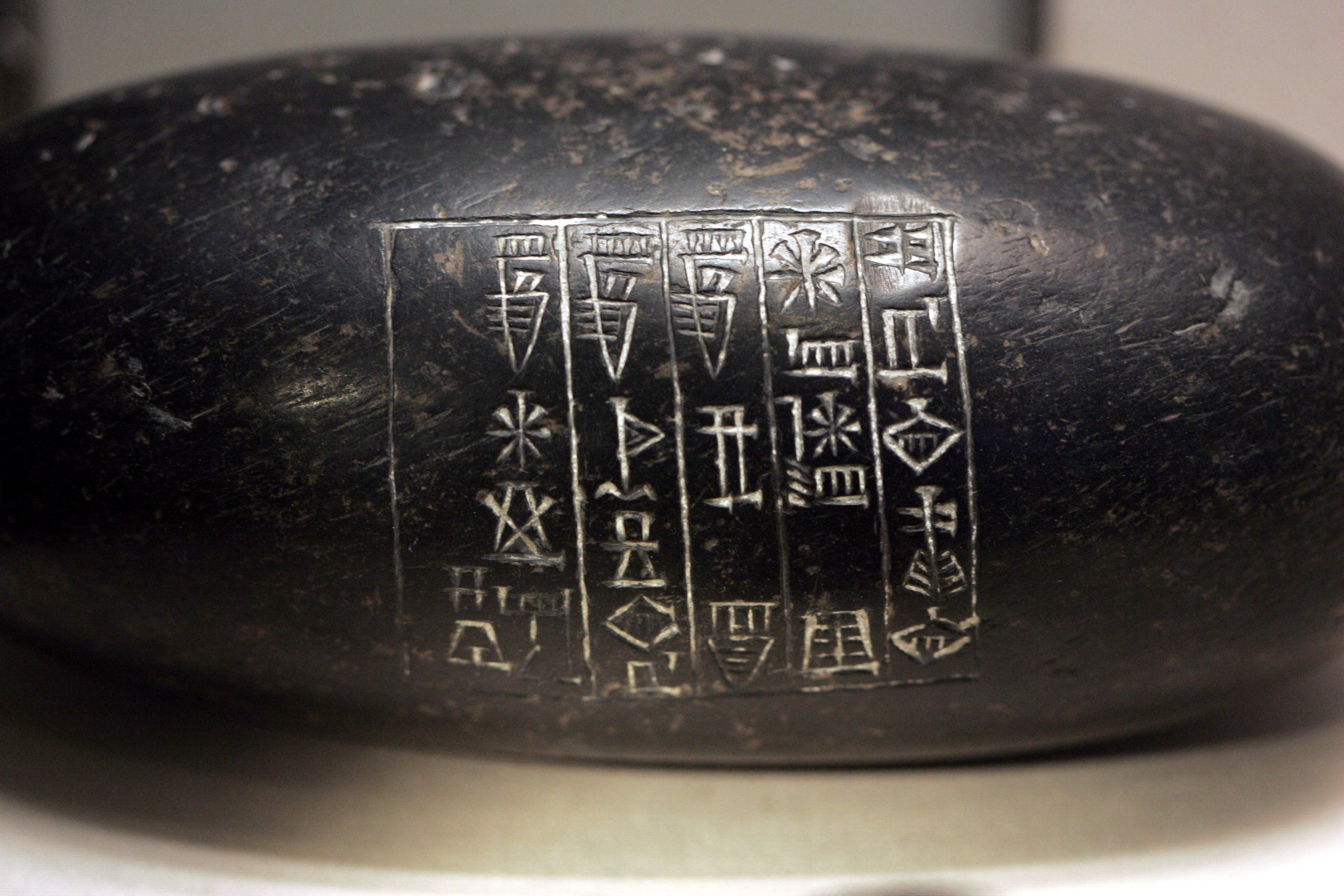
5-mina weight with the name of Shu-Shin, king of Sumer and Akkad

Ernest Choquin de Sarzec (1832–1901) was a French archaeologist, to whom is attributed the discovery of the civilization of ancient Sumer. He was in the French diplomatic service; on being transferred to Basra in 1872 as a vice-consul, he became interested in the excavations at Ur, started by the British diplomat J. E. Taylor.

In 1877, he began a dig at Telloh (the ancient Girsu, as it transpired, rather than Lagash as once supposed). The site, in present-day Iraq in the southern delta lowlands, had been drawn to his attention by local dealers in antiquities. During the 1880s he succeeded in finding evidence of the reign of Gudea. He continued to work on the site until 1901.
