= Foundation figures =

Ancient Mesopotamian artworks

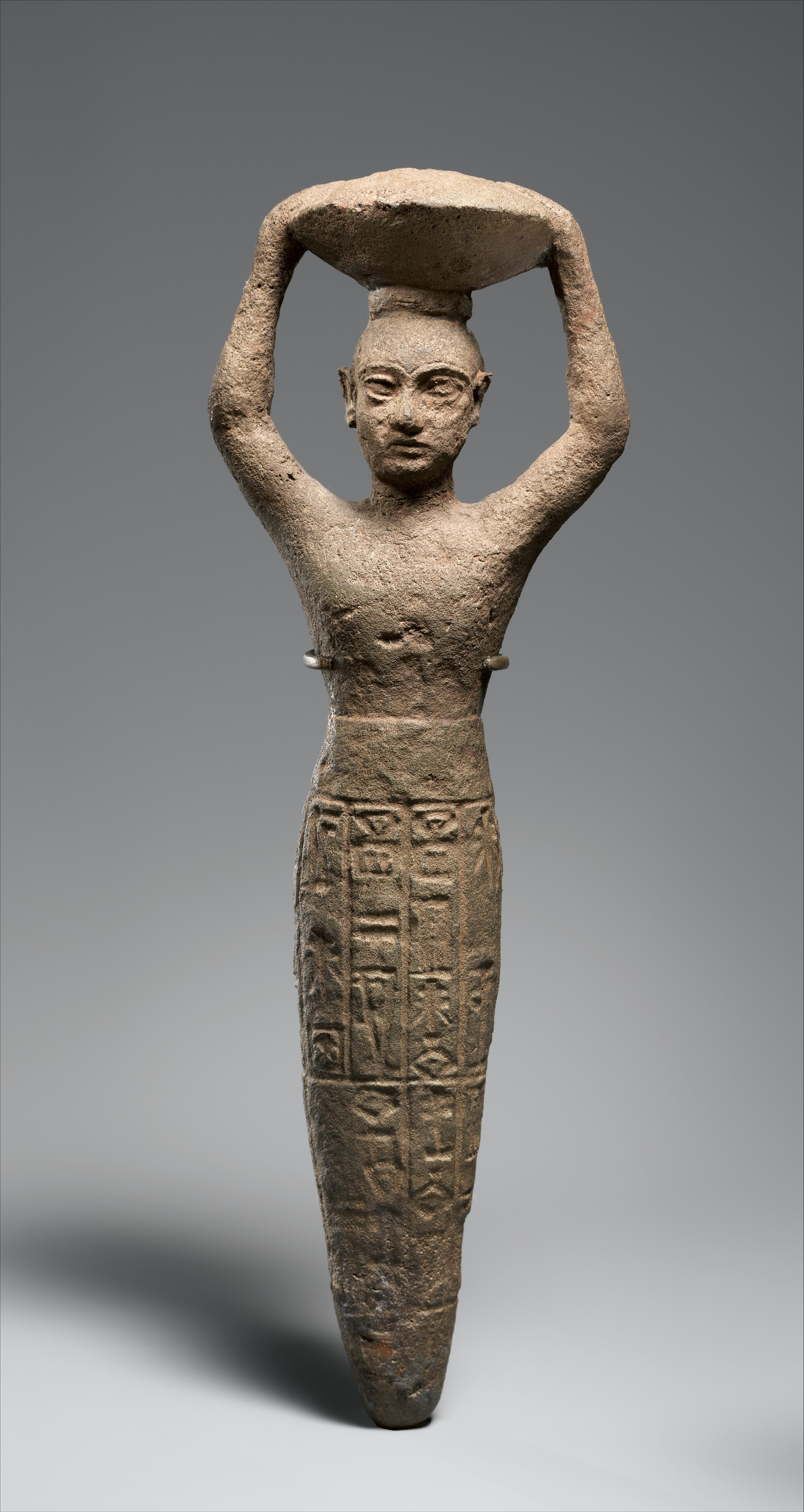
Foundation figure in the form of a peg surmounted by the bust of King Ur-Namma, Neo-Sumerian, Ur III period, reign of Ur-Namma, c. 2112–2094 BCE.

Foundation figures were ritualistic works of art from the Early Dynastic period that were used in the construction of ancient Mesopotamian temples. Foundation pegs first appeared in ancient Sumer around the third millennium BCE. Stylized as anthropomorphic nails, foundation figures were symbolically used to mark the grounds of a temple. These nails/pegs were either hammered around the foundation of the temple, along with an inscribed tablet, or they were buried in clay boxes under the foundation of the temple. Typically, the pegs were created to represent either the deity that the temple was honoring, or the king that orchestrated the construction of the temple. Many of the pegs discovered stand about a foot tall and show a clear attention to detail. It is believed that foundation figures were used for solely ritualistic purposes. This is because they were not meant to be seen by the public, yet still show a high level of detail and aesthetic thought.

== Overview ==
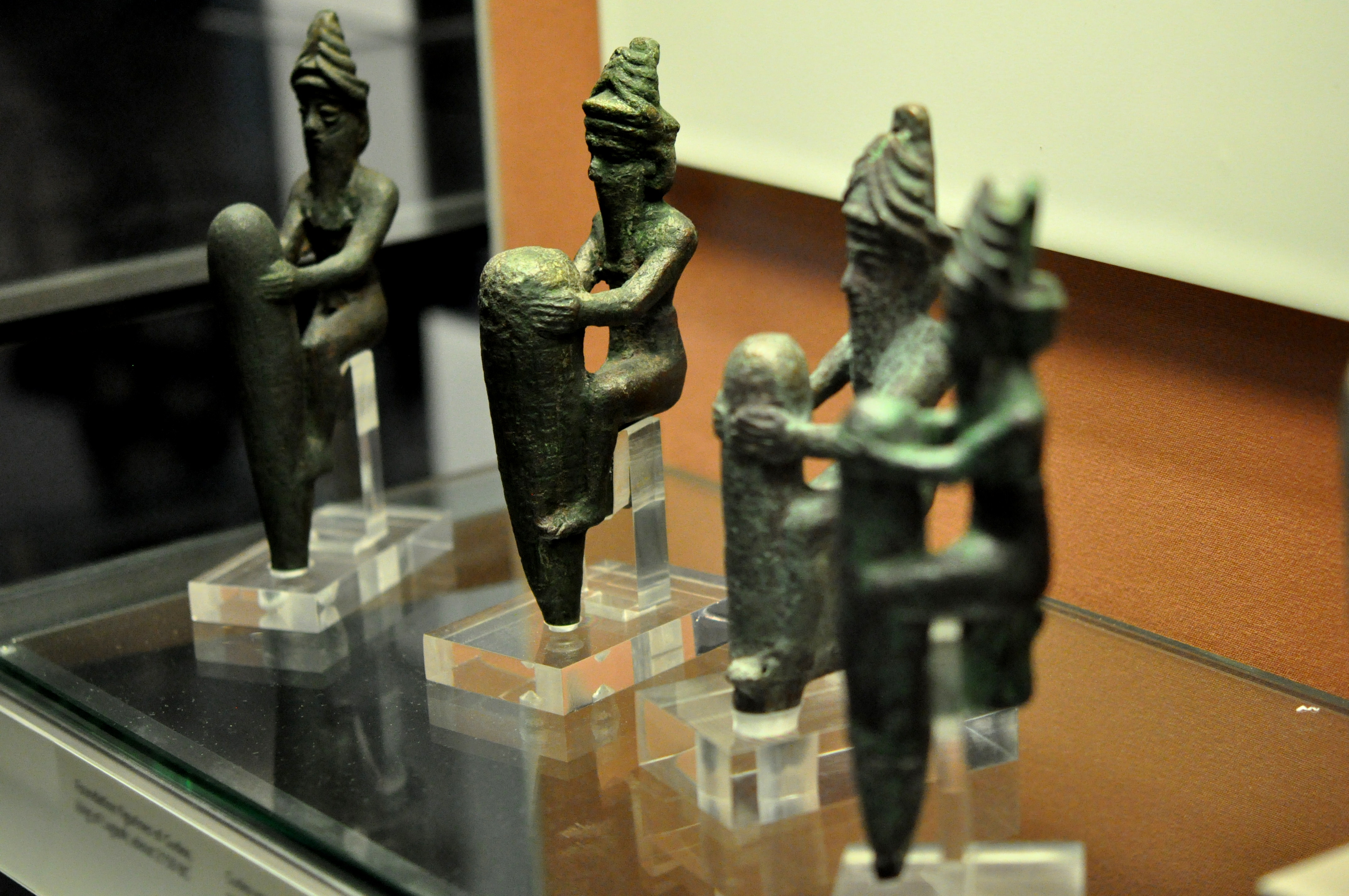
Four copper-alloy foundation figures dating to c. 2130 BCE, depicting four ancient Mesopotamian gods, wearing characteristic horned crowns

The foundation figures of the Early Dynastic period are part of a long history of Near Eastern practices concerning sacred boundary-marking. The earliest foundation deposits containing sculptural pegs are believed to have originated in Sumer in the third millennium BCE. The practice lasted at least until the rule of Rim-Suen, an Amorite king of Larsa who ruled from 1822 to 1763 BCE. Few foundation deposits have been discovered and documented well enough to shed light on their importance to the Early Dynastic Sumerians, but thorough archaeological records for deposits found beneath temple foundations in Ur, Uruk, and Nippur illuminate how the ancient Sumerians used these figurines. The deposits discovered at those sites contained statuettes and tablets inside baked brick boxes which had been buried at strategic locations marking the perimeter, doorways, and paths of circulation inside the temples.

Though the foundation pegs from Ur, Uruk, and Nippur were discovered under temple foundations, some scholars believe they served a different purpose prior to burial. The Early Dynastic Sumerian kings may have originally used the pegs as surveying pegs in a ritual boundary-marking ceremony to signify that the enclosed land was the dedicated site of a future temple. The pegs were later buried under the temple's foundation, along with plano-convex tablets that represented bricks, as a link between the ruler who built the temple and both the gods and future rulers who might uncover the deposits in the course of future building projects. The discovery of foundation pegs and their accompanying deposits help archaeologists determine the nature of sites being excavated. Without locating a foundation deposit, it can be difficult to establish if the structure was a temple or an elite dwelling. Most scholars consider foundation figures to specifically delineate sacred boundaries, and their presence helps archaeologists identify temples.

Foundation pegs should differentiated from the clay nails used to fasten votive plaques to temple walls, which were also common in Early Dynastic temples. While votive plaques may have been used to mark doorways, they served as a different kind of boundary marker than foundation pegs. Foundation pegs were made of metal, typically solid cast copper. The nails used to affix votive plaques to the walls were instead typically made of clay. Pegs and nails were also placed in different locations. As previously stated, pegs were originally used as surveying markers and later buried under the temple foundations. Nails were instead designed to affix plaques vertically to temple walls.

== Depictions ==
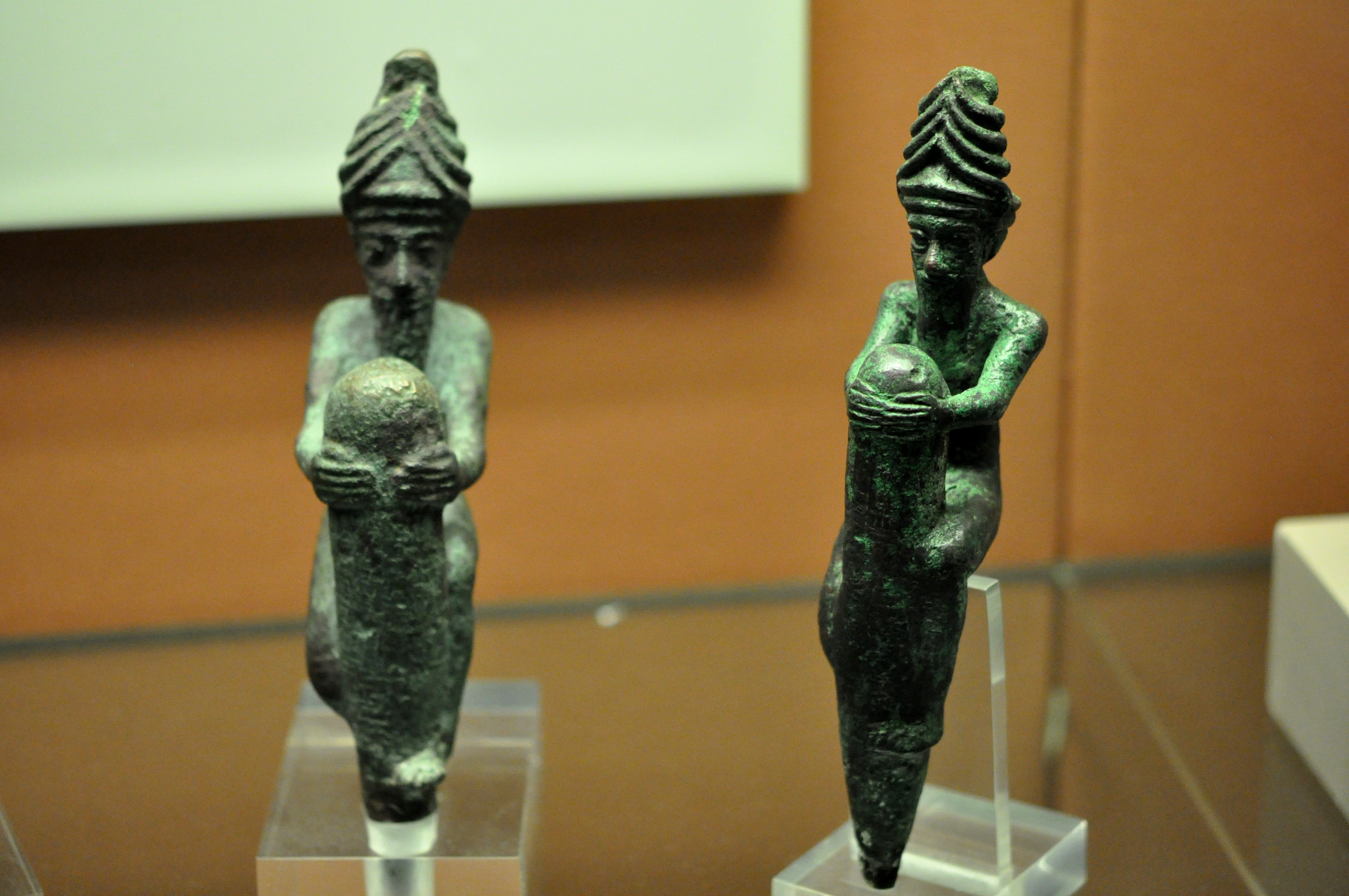
Foundation pegs from Temple of Ningirsu, Girsu, Kingdom of Lagash, c. 2130 BCE.

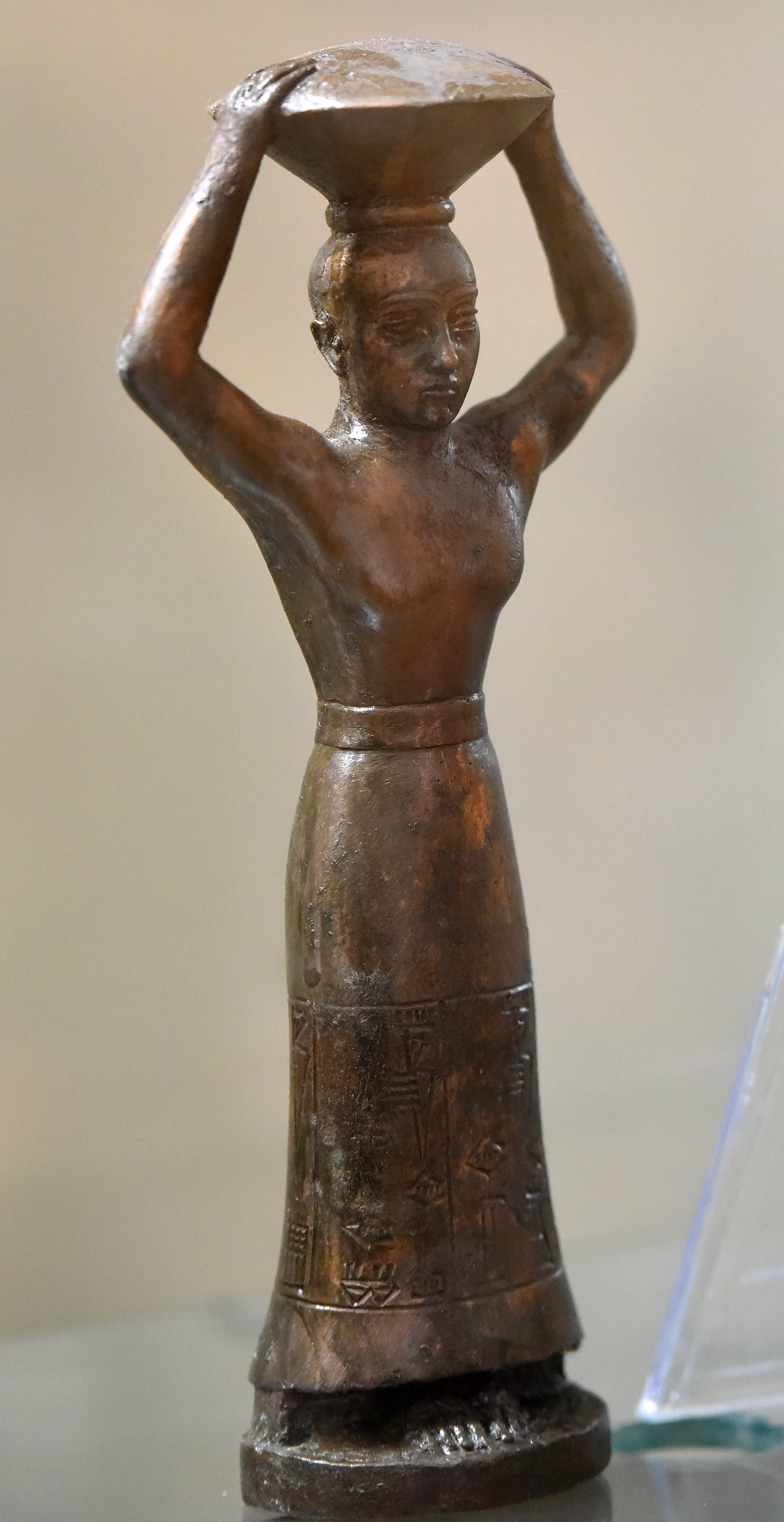
Foundation figurine of Ur-Nammu, from Nippur, Iraq. 21st century BCE. Iraq Museum

Similar to clay nails used for ornamentation in much Early Dynastic architecture, foundation pegs were three dimensional conic forms buried deep in the earth, sometimes in ornate boxes, meant to denote a sacred space or place of worship. The pegs varied in complexity from simple cones with inscribed incantations, to forms of gods, humans, or powerful animals accompanying inscriptions. The imbued form was meant to give the subsequent building additional protection and dedicate it to a patron god or king. Early Dynastic Sumerian pegs often took the form of Anunnaki, a group of deities including the "seven gods who decree", the most important figures of the Sumerian pantheon. These figures are often represented with horned crowns and are easily identified by scholars.

Other human forms were often inscribed with the name of the subject. The earliest foundation pegs found to date contain Cuneiform inscriptions. By the rule of Ur-Namma, foundation pegs were inscribed in Sumerian. One example is the bust of King Ur-Nammu, the inscription of which has been translated from Sumerian: To Inanna the lady of Eanna, his lady, Ur-Namma the mighty king, King of Ur, King of Sumer and Akkad, her temple he built, to its place he restored it. Excavated pegs show a change in preferred material depending on location in the structure. Early pegs, as well as pegs found in walls, were limestone or clay. Those found buried were typically a copper alloy cast.

== Purpose and use ==
Foundation figures buried under the corners of Early Dynastic temples provided insight to the construction of the temples they were found under. Inscriptions, cylinder seals, and steatite tablets found with the figures aided in identifying the temples they were covered by. Scholars speculate that they were used in ritual practice prior to burial. Once buried, they delineated sacred boundaries. These pegs, made from a range of materials over time, were found buried marking the perimeter, entryways, and hallways of the temples. While the figures were ornate and made of precious metals or clay, they were purely votive as they were fully submerged in the earth, created and buried with no intention of retrieval.

The foundation figurines found under the northeastern wall of Temple of the Goddess Nimintabba in Ur, were encased within baked brick boxes, accompanied by steatite tablets, with the figurines positioned standing and leaning north east. The steatite rested on the bottom of the sealed box. Across the lower half of the figurine is an inscription describing the formation of the temple. The inscription reads, “Nimintabba, his lady, Shulgi, mighty man, king of Ur, King of Sumer and Akkad, her house, built.” The inscription dedicates the temple to the goddess Nimintabba. The male figurine represents the king Shulgi, a connection provided by the historical implication of the figure's posture. The posture of the figurine replicates the posture associated with royal iconography established in the mid-third millennium B.C. The basket atop the head of the figurine also resembles images of Assurbanipal (686-627 B.C.) with a basket on top of his head. Inscriptions connect this image with the construction of the temple. These pieces of evidence combined with the inscription on the lower half of the figures contribute to the probability that the figurines under the Temple of the Goddess Nimintabba were dedications to Nimintabba by Shulgi, claiming responsibility for the construction of the temple.

== See also ==
- Clay nail
- Hurrian foundation pegs - (Akkadian)
- Third Dynasty of Ur - (Ur III)
- Kīla (Buddhism)
