= Edin (Sumerian term) =

Toponym

Edin (Sumerian: 𒀀𒇉𒂔 ^{ÍD}EDIN, 'steppe' or 'plain'; Akkadian: 𒉌𒋾𒈝 i_{3}-ti-num_{2}) is a toponym featured on the Gudea cylinders as a watercourse from which plaster is taken to build a temple for Ningirsu:

Clay plaster, harmoniously blended clay taken from the Edin canal, has been chosen by Lord Ningirsu with his holy heart, and was painted by Gudea with the splendors of heaven, as if kohl were being poured all over it.

Thorkild Jacobsen suggested this "Idedin" canal was an as yet unidentified "Desert Canal", which "probably refers to an abandoned canal bed that had filled with the characteristic purplish dune sand still seen in southern Iraq". Friedrich Delitzsch and numerous other scholars of linguistics and Assyriology believe the Abrahamic term Eden traces back to this term. A few scholars of Judaism posit the word may originate from Aramaic.

== See also ==
- Dilmun
- Ekur
- Gudea cylinders
- Hubur
- Hursag
