= Gudea cylinders =

Pair of Lagash terracotta cylinders

Gudea cylinders

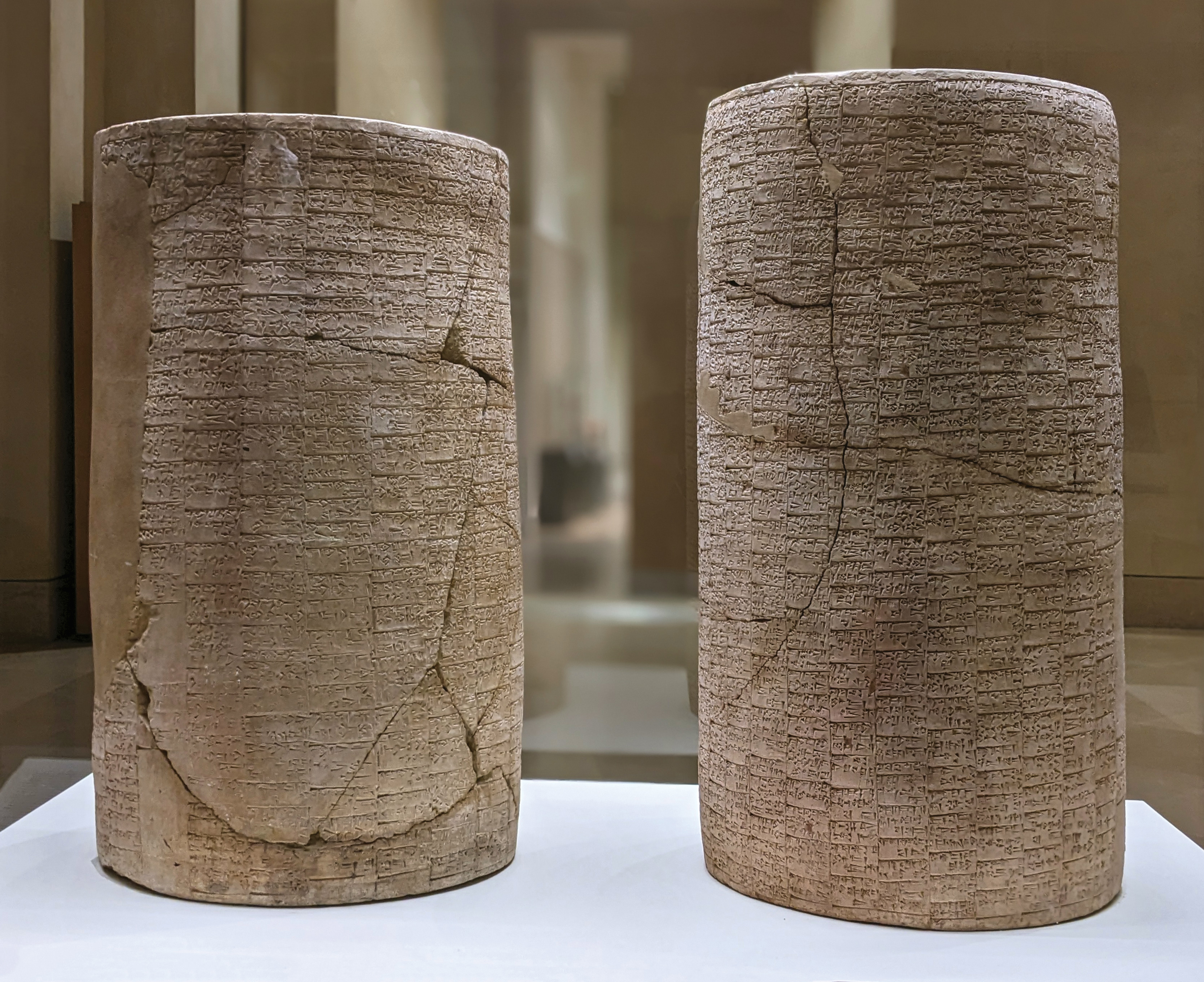
Gudea cylinders B and A. Two cylinders telling of the construction of the temple of Ninurta (Ningursu), Girsu. 2125 BC. Terra cotta. Louvre Museum

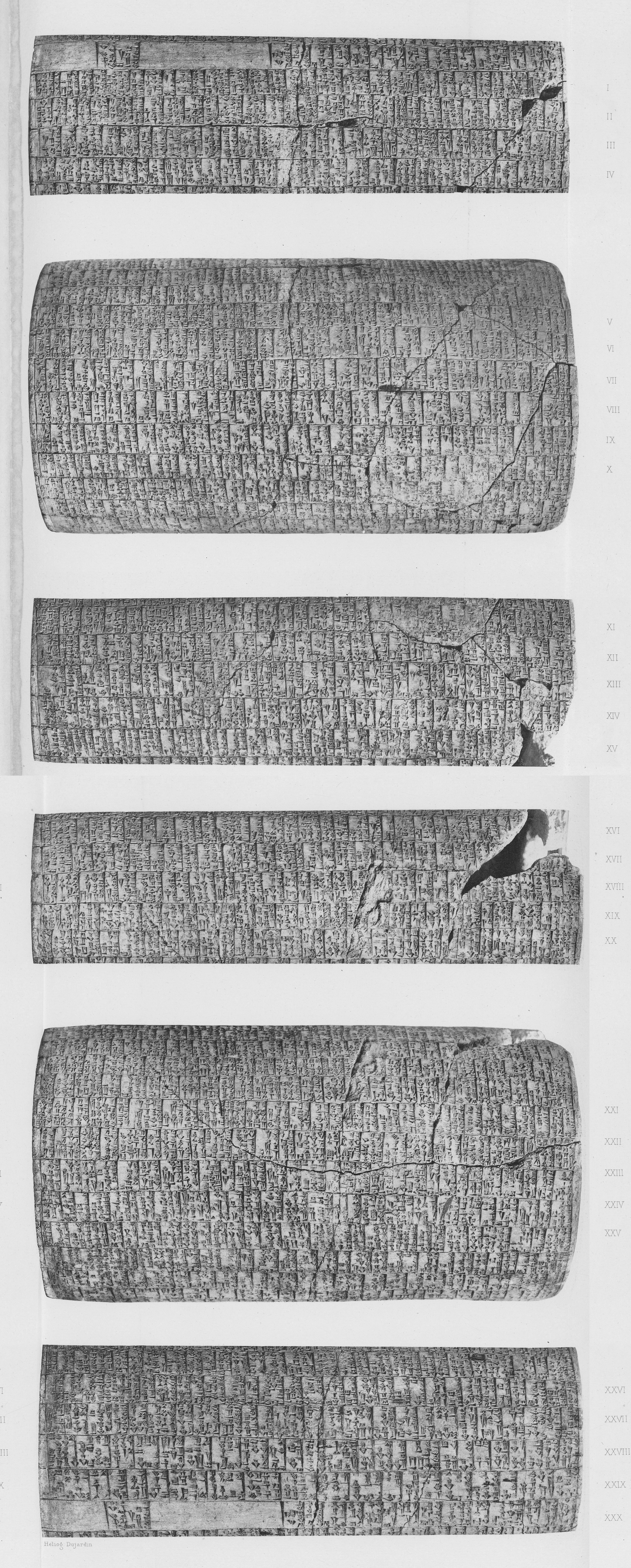
Gudea cylinder A

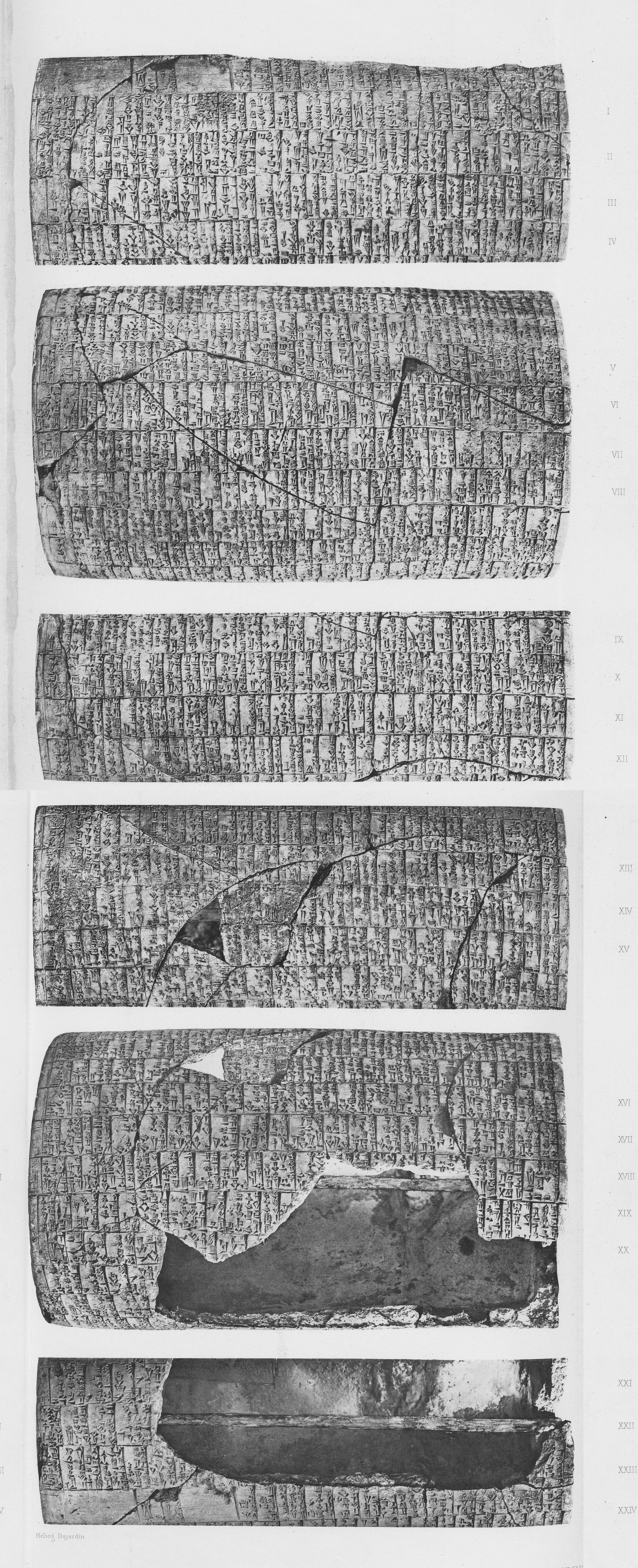
Gudea cylinder B

Content photographs by Ernest de Sarzec (1896)

The Gudea cylinders are a pair of terracotta cylinders dating to c. 2125 BC, on which is written in cuneiform a Sumerian myth called the Building of Ningirsu's temple. The cylinders were made by Gudea, the ruler of Lagash, and were found in 1877 during excavations at Telloh (ancient Girsu), Iraq and are now displayed in the Louvre in Paris, France. They are the largest cuneiform cylinders yet discovered and contain the longest known text written in the Sumerian language.

== Compilation ==
=== Discovery ===
The cylinders were found in a drain by Ernest de Sarzec under the Eninnu temple complex at Telloh, the ancient ruins of the Sumerian holy city of Girsu, during the first season of excavations in 1877. They were found next to a building known as the Agaren, where a brick pillar (pictured) was found containing an inscription describing its construction by Gudea within Eninnu during the Second Dynasty of Lagash. The Agaren was described on the pillar as a place of judgement, or mercy seat, and it is thought that the cylinders were either kept there or elsewhere in the Eninnu. They are thought to have fallen into the drain during the destruction of Girsu generations later. In 1878, the cylinders were shipped to Paris, France where they remain on display today at the Louvre, Department of Near East antiquities, Richelieu, ground floor, room 2, accession numbers MNB 1511 and MNB 1512.

=== Description ===
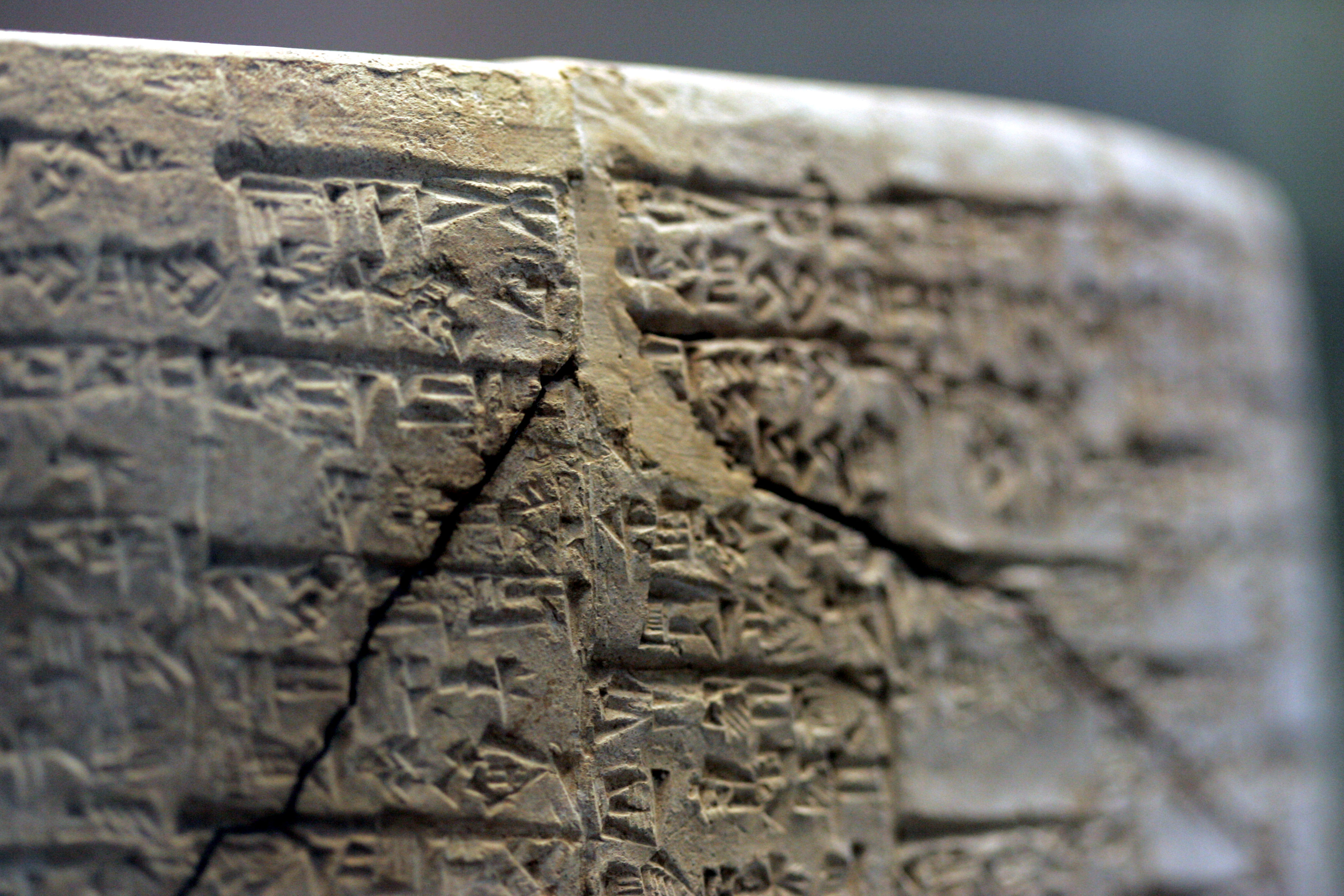
Gudea cylinder close up showing cuneiform

The two cylinders were labelled A and B, with A being 61 cm high with a diameter of 32 cm and B being 56 cm with a diameter of 33 cm. The cylinders were hollow with perforations in the centre for mounting. These were originally found with clay plugs filling the holes, and the cylinders themselves filled with an unknown type of plaster. The clay shells of the cylinders are approximately 2.5 to 3 cm thick. Both cylinders were cracked and in need of restoration and the Louvre still holds 12 cylinder fragments, some of which can be used to restore a section of cylinder B. Cylinder A contains thirty columns and cylinder B twenty four. These columns are divided into between sixteen and thirty-five cases per column containing between one and six lines per case. The cuneiform was meant to be read with the cylinders in a horizontal position and is a typical form used between the Akkadian Empire and the Ur III dynasty, typical of inscriptions dating to the 2nd Dynasty of Lagash. Script differences in the shapes of certain signs indicate that the cylinders were written by different scribes.

=== Translations and commentaries ===
Detailed reproductions of the cylinders were made by Ernest de Sarzec in his excavation reports which are still used in modern times. The first translation and transliteration was published by Francois Threau-Dangin in 1905. Another edition with a notable concordance was published by Ira Maurice Price in 1927. Further translations were made by M. Lambert and R. Tournay in 1948, Adam Falkenstein in 1953, Giorgio Castellino in 1977, Thorkild Jacobsen in 1987, and Dietz Otto Edzard in 1997. The latest translation by the Electronic Text Corpus of Sumerian Literature (ETCSL) project was prepared by Gábor Zólyomi with legacy material from Joachim Krecher. Samuel Noah Kramer also published a detailed commentary in 1966 and in 1988. Herbert Sauren proposed that the text of the cylinders comprised a ritual play, enactment or pageant that was performed during yearly temple dedication festivities and that certain sections of both cylinders narrate the script and give the ritual order of events of a seven-day festival. This proposition was met with limited acceptance.

== Composition ==
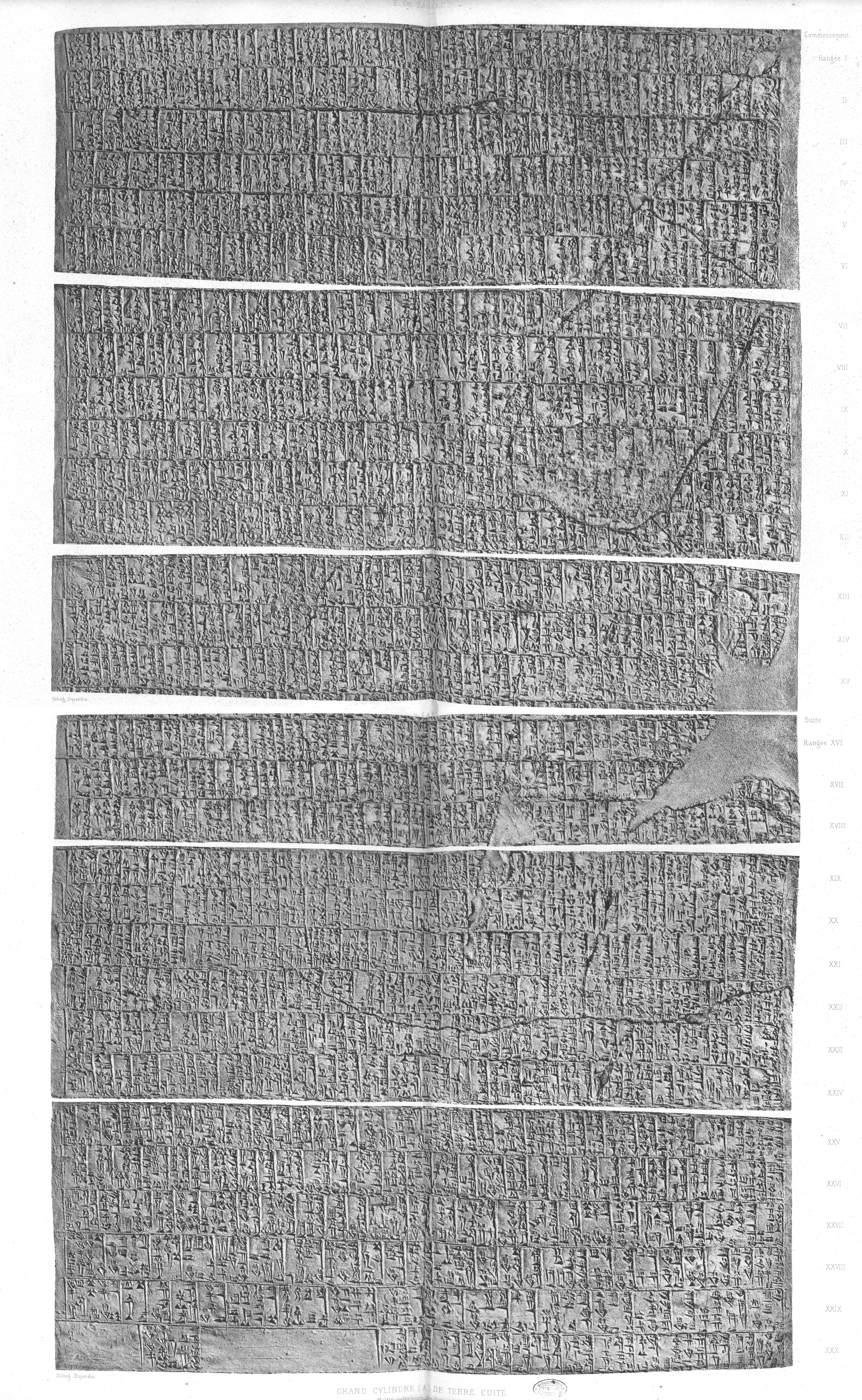
Full text of Cylinder A. Reproduction by Ernest de Sarzec, 1896.

Interpretation of the text faces substantial limitations for modern scholars, who are not the intended recipients of the information and do not share a common knowledge of the ancient world and the background behind the literature. Irene Winter points out that understanding the story demands "the viewer's prior knowledge and correct identification of the scene – a process of 'matching' rather than 'reading' of imagery itself qua narrative." The hero of the story is Gudea (statue pictured), king of the city-state of Lagash at the end of the third millennium BC. A large quantity of sculpted and inscribed artifacts have survived pertaining to his reconstruction and dedication of the Eninnu, the temple of Ningursu, the patron deity of Lagash. These include foundation nails (pictured), building plans (pictured) and pictorial accounts sculpted on limestone stelae. The temple, Eninnu was a formidable complex of buildings, likely including the E-pa, Kasurra and sanctuary of Bau among others. There are no substantial architectural remains of Gudea's buildings, so the text is the best record of his achievements.

=== Cylinder X ===
Some fragments of another Gudea inscription were found that could not be pieced together with the two in the Louvre. This has led some scholars to suggest that there was a missing cylinder preceding the texts recovered. It has been argued that the two cylinders present a balanced and complete literary with a line at the end of Cylinder A having been suggested by Falkenstein to mark the middle of the composition. This colophon has however also been suggested to mark the cylinder itself as the middle one in a group of three. The opening of cylinder A also shows similarities to the openings of other myths with the destinies of heaven and earth being determined. Various conjectures have been made regarding the supposed contents of an initial cylinder. Victor Hurowitz suggested it may have contained an introductory hymn praising Ningirsu and Lagash. Thorkild Jacobsen suggested it may have explained why a relatively recent similar temple built by Ur-baba (or Ur-bau), Gudea's father-in-law "was deemed insufficient". It is not certain that the fragments are of Gudea versus some other Lagash ruler such as Ur-baba.

=== Cylinder A ===
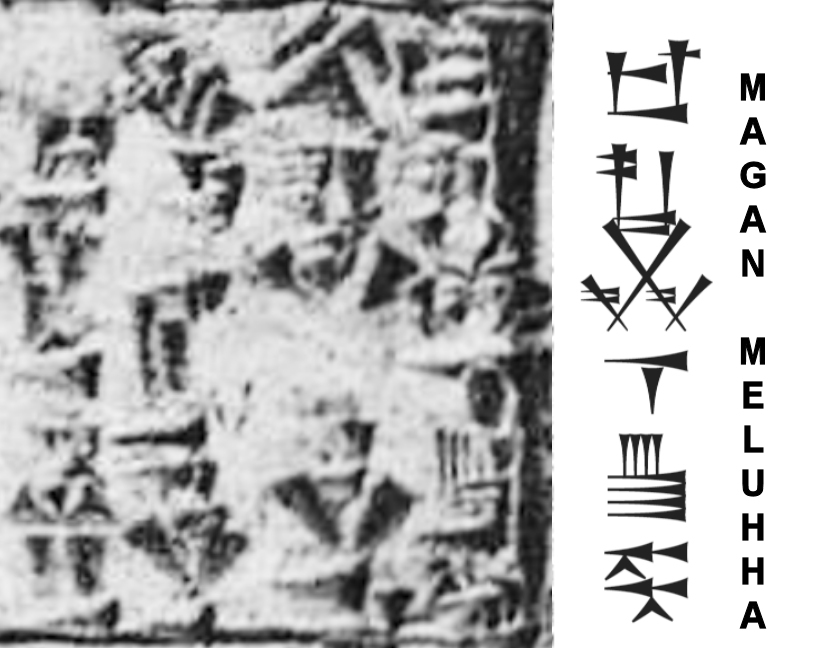
Gudea cylinders inscription A IX:19. Gudea mentions the devotions to his Temple: "Magan and Meluhha will come down from their mountains to attend". The words Magan (𒈣𒃶) and Meluhha (𒈨𒈛𒄩) appear vertically in the first column on the right.

Cylinder A opens on a day in the distant past when destinies were determined with Enlil, the highest god in the Sumerian pantheon, in session with the Divine Council and looking with admiration at his son Ningirsu (another name for Ninurta) and his city, Lagash.

Upon the day for making of decisions in matters of the world, Lagash in great office raised the head, and Enlil looked at Lord Ningirsu truly, was moved to have the things appropriate appear in our city.

Ningirsu responds that his governor will build a temple dedicated to great accomplishments. Gudea is then sent a dream where a giant man – with wings, a crown, and two lions – commanded him to build the E-ninnu temple. Two figures then appear: a woman holding a gold stylus, and a hero holding a lapis lazuli tablet on which he drew the plan of a house. The hero placed bricks in a brick mold and carrying basket, in front of Gudea – while a donkey gestured impatiently with its hoof. After waking, Gudea could not understand the dream so traveled to visit the goddess Nanse by canal for interpretation of the oracle. Gudea stops at several shrines on the route to make offerings to various other deities. Nanse explains that the giant man is her brother Ningirsu, and the woman with the golden stylus is Nisaba goddess of writing, directing him to lay out the temple astronomically aligned with the "holy stars". The hero is Nindub an architect-god surveying the plan of the temple. The donkey was supposed to represent Gudea himself, eager to get on with the building work.

Nanse instructs Gudea to build Ningirsu – a decorated chariot with emblem, weapons, and drums, which he does and takes into the temple with balaĝ-instrument, ušumgal- kalam-ma, "Dragon of the Land". He is rewarded with Ningirsu's blessing and a second dream where he is given more detailed instructions of the structure. Gudea then instructs the people of Lagash and gives judgement on the city with a 'code of ethics and morals'. Gudea takes to the work zealously and measures the building site, then lays the first brick in a festive ritual. Materials for the construction are brought from over a wide area including Susa, Elam, Magan Meluhha and Lebanon. Cedars of Lebanon are apparently floated down from Lebanon on the Euphrates and the "Iturungal" canal to Girsu.

To the mountain of cedars, not for man to enter, did for Lord Ningirsu, Gudea bend his steps: its cedars with great axes he cut down, and into Sharur ... Like giant serpents floating on the water, cedar rafts from the cedar foothills.

He is then sent a third dream revealing the different form and character of the temples. The construction of the structure is then detailed with the laying of the foundations, involving participation from the Anunnaki including Enki, Nanse, and Bau. Different parts of the temple are described along with its furnishings and the cylinder concludes with a hymn of praise to it.

Lines 738 to 758 describe the house being finished with "kohl" and a type of plaster from the "edin" canal:

The fearsomeness of the E-ninnu covers all the lands like a garment! The house! It is founded by An on refined silver! It is painted with kohl, and comes out as the moonlight with heavenly splendor! The house! Its front is a great mountain firmly grounded! Its inside resounds with incantations and harmonious hymns! Its exterior is the sky, a great house rising in abundance! Its outer assembly hall is the Anunnaki gods place of rendering judgments – from its ...... words of prayer can be heard! Its food supply is the abundance of the gods! Its standards erected around the house are the Anzu bird (pictured) spreading its wings over the bright mountain! E-ninnu's clay plaster, harmoniously blended clay taken from the Edin canal, has been chosen by Lord Nin-jirsu with his holy heart, and was painted by Gudea with the splendors of heaven as if kohl were being poured all over it.

Thorkild Jacobsen considered this "Idedin" canal referred to an unidentified "Desert Canal", which he considered "probably refers to an abandoned canal bed that had filled with the characteristic purplish dune sand still seen in southern Iraq."

=== Cylinder B ===
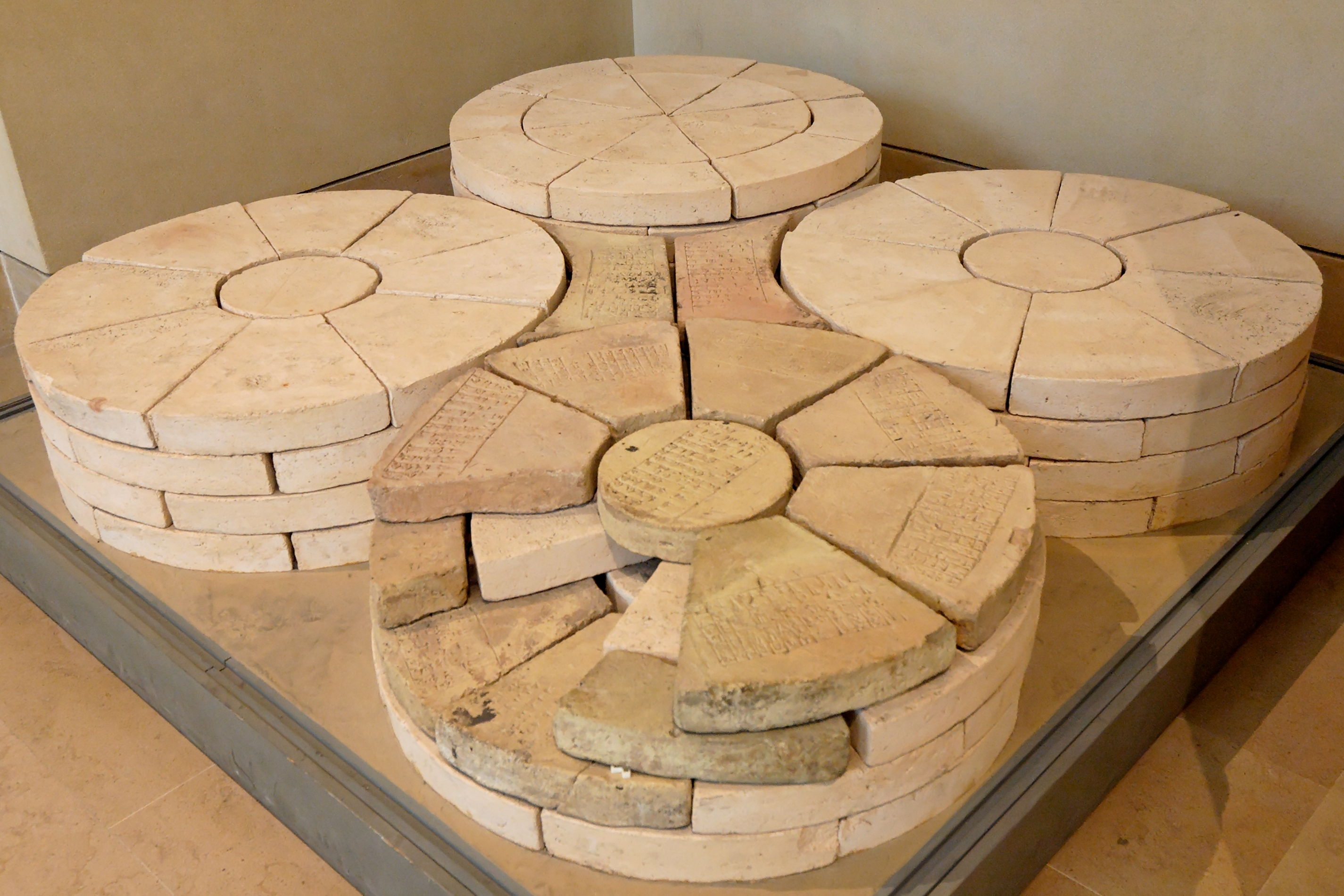
The "Pillar of Gudea", reconstructed with ancient bricks and modern copies—consisting of four round columns placed side by side. The inscription mentions a cedarwood portico, court of justice of Ningirsu. Found in the south-west of the temple of Ningirsu in Girsu. Clay, ca. 2125 BC. Louvre Museum, Paris, AO 388

The second cylinder begins with a narrative hymn starting with a prayer to the Anunnaki. Gudea then announces the house ready for the accommodation of Ningirsu and his wife Bau. Food and drink are prepared, incense is lit and a ceremony is organized to welcome the gods into their home. The city is then judged again and a number of deities are appointed by Enki to fill various positions within the structure. These include a gatekeeper, bailiff, butler, chamberlain, coachman, goatherd, gamekeeper, grain and fisheries inspectors, musicians, armourers and a messenger. After a scene of sacred marriage between Ningirsu and Bau, a seven-day celebration is given by Gudea for Ningirsu with a banquet dedicated to Anu, Enlil and Ninmah (Ninhursag), the major gods of Sumer, who are all in attendance. The text closes with lines of praise for Ningirsu and the Eninnu temple.

An example of the Cylinder B text:

"When his (Gudea's) king (Ningirsu) had entered the house, for seven days the slave-girl was the equal of her mistress, the slave walked by the side of his master. In his city the strong and the weak slept side by side. From evil speech the word was altered; wickedness was turned back into its house; the just laws of Nanshe and Ningirsu were strictly adhered etc. The orphan was not given over to the rich; the widow was not given over to the powerful; in the house where there was no male heir, the daughter was the heir."

=== The building of Ningirsu's temple ===
The modern name for the myth contained on both cylinders is "The building of Ningirsu's temple". Ningirsu was associated with the yearly spring rains, a force essential to early irrigation agriculture. Thorkild Jacobsen describes the temple as an intensely sacred place and a visual assurance of the presence of the god in the community, suggesting the structure was "in a mystical sense, one with him." The element "Ninnu" in the name of the temple "E-Ninnu" is a name of Ningirsu with the full form of its name, "E-Ninnu-Imdugud-babbara" meaning "house Ninnu, the flashing thunderbird". It is directly referred to as thunderbird in Gudea's second dream and in his blessing of it.

== Later use ==
Preceded by the Kesh temple hymn, the Gudea cylinders are one of the first ritual temple building stories ever recorded. The style, traditions and format of the account has notable similarities to those in the Bible such as the building of the tabernacle of Moses in Exodus 25 and Numbers 7. Victor Hurowitz has also noted similarities to the later account of the construction of Solomon's Temple in 1 Kings 6:1–38, 1 Kings Chapter 7, and Chapter 8 and in the Book of Chronicles.

== See also ==
- Atra-Hasis
- Babylonian literature
- Barton Cylinder
- Deluge (mythology)
- Debate between sheep and grain
- Debate between bird and fish
- Debate between Winter and Summer
- Enlil and Ninlil
- Eridu Genesis
- Gilgamesh flood myth
- Hymn to Enlil
- Kesh temple hymn
- Lament for Ur
- Old Babylonian oracle
- Self-praise of Shulgi (Shulgi D)
- Sumerian literature
- Sumerian religion
- The Garden of Eden
