= E-ninnu =

Sumerian temple

- Location within Iraq
- 31°33′43.3″N 46°10′39.3″E
- Type: Temple
- Location: Tell Telloh, Dhi Qar Province, Iraq
- Region: Mesopotamia
- Part of: Girsu

History
- Built: c. 2120 BC
- Built by: Gudea

Site notes
- Material: mud brick

The E-ninnu 𒂍𒐐 (House of 50) was the E (temple) to the warrior god Ningirsu in the Sumerian city of Girsu in southern Mesopotamia. Girsu was the religious centre of a state that was named Lagash after its most populous city, which lay 25 km (16 mi) southeast of Girsu. Rulers of Lagash who contributed to the structure of the E-ninnu included Ur-Nanshe of Lagash in the late 26th century BC, his grandson Eannatum in the following century, Urukagina in the 24th century and Gudea, ruler of Lagash in the mid 22nd century BC.

The site has yielded inscribed bricks naming Ur-Nanshe and Eannatum, but most bricks date from the restoration effected by Gudea. The Gudea cylinders, perhaps the longest surviving text written in the Sumerian language, give a semi-mythical account of the building of the temple, along with a description of the rituals and symbols associated with E-ninnu.

Some form of temple to Ningirsu probably existed from the early days of the city. Sumerian gods were generally associated with particular cities and Ningirsu means "Lord of Girsu". There was also a temple to Ningirsu called the Bagara in the larger nearby city of Lagash, where the rulers of Lagash had their palace.

== Excavations ==
More than a dozen diorite statues of Gudea were discovered, during French excavations at Girsu in the late 19th and early 20th centuries, in a Hellenistic-era shrine on the Mound of the Palais.

The Adadnadinakhe bricks show that the shrine was built by a minor local king, Adad-Nadin-Akhe, to honour Gudea on the site of his temple to Ningirsu, which was then already 2000 years old. Adad-Nadin-Akhe also built a Parthian style palace on the site. The French excavators never realized that the enigmatic E-ninnu they were searching for was directly underneath this shrine, and halted excavations in 1933. Over 80 years later excavators returned to the site under the direction of the British Museum. The head of excavations, Sebastien Rey, was able to finally locate the temple in 2016 and has led several seasons of excavation at the site. In February 2023, archaeologists from the British Museum and Getty Museum identified the E-ninnu temple alongside the remains of the 4,500 year-old Sumerian Lord Palace of the Kings and more than 200 cuneiform tablets containing administrative records of Girsu.

== Gallery ==
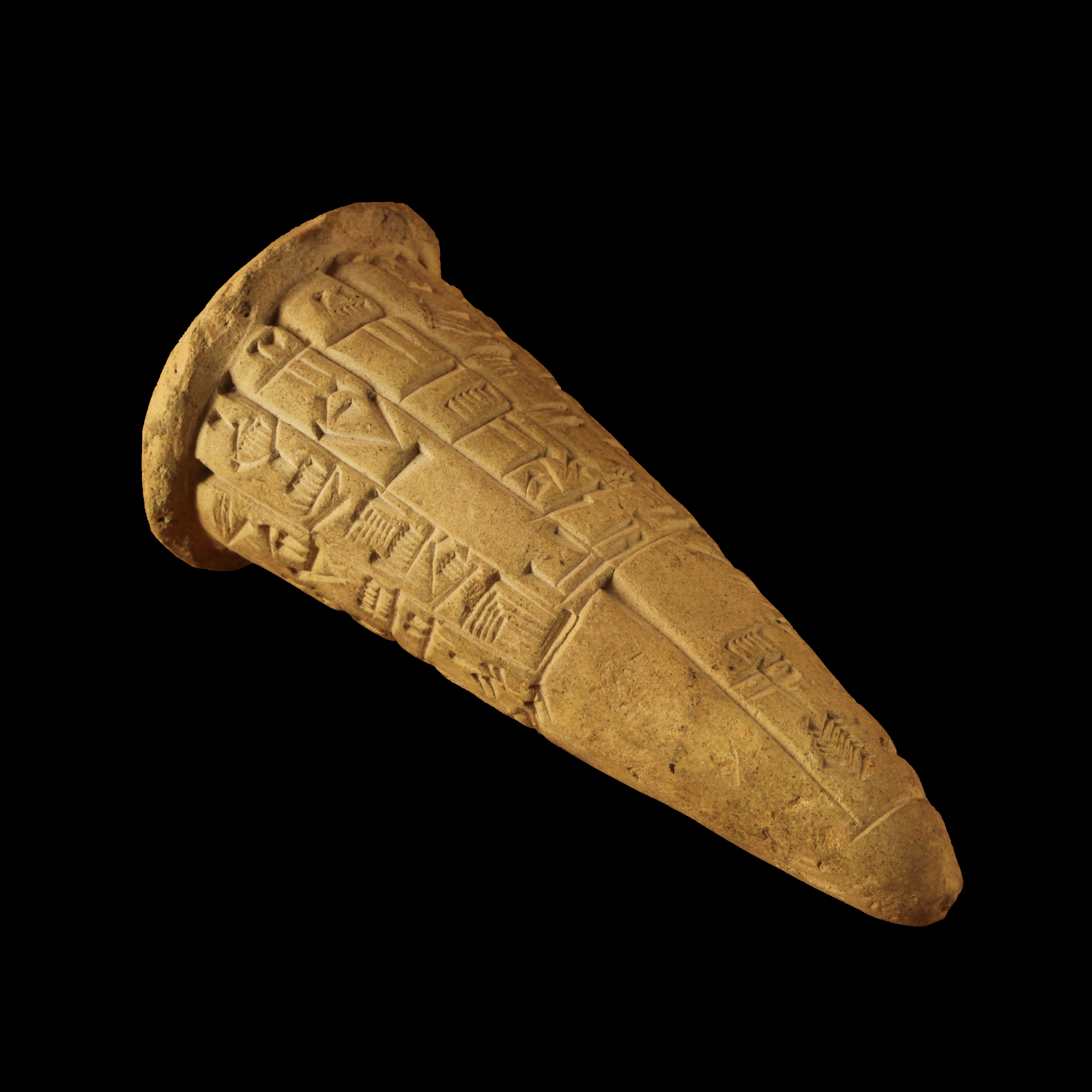
Foundation nail dedicated by Gudea to Ningirsu for the building of his temple, the E-ninnu, Museum of Fine Arts of Lyon

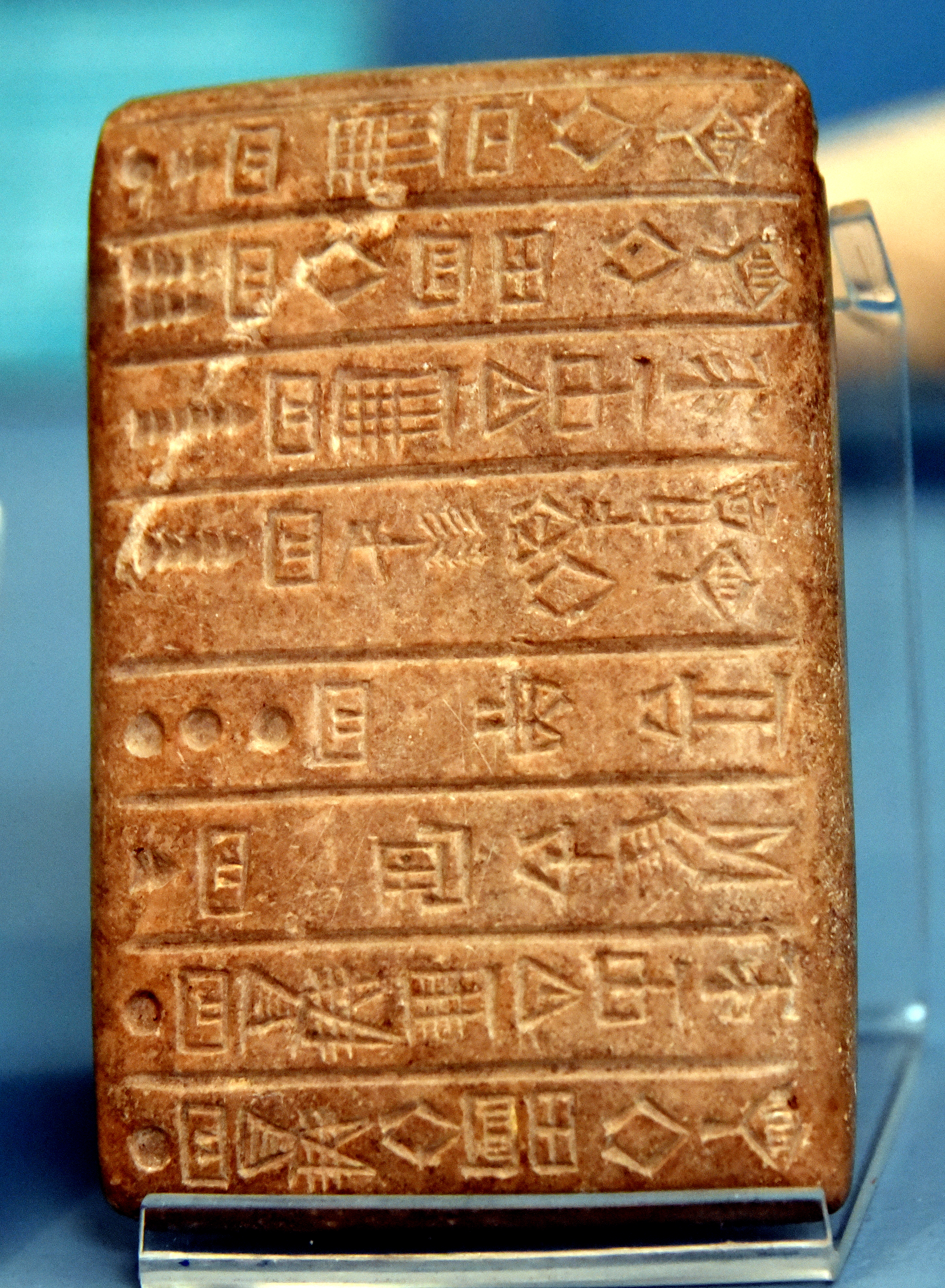
Stone tablet. List of various garments dedicated to the temple of E-ninnu by the Akkadian king Rimush. 23rd century BCE. From Nippur, Iraq. Ancient Orient Museum, Istanbul

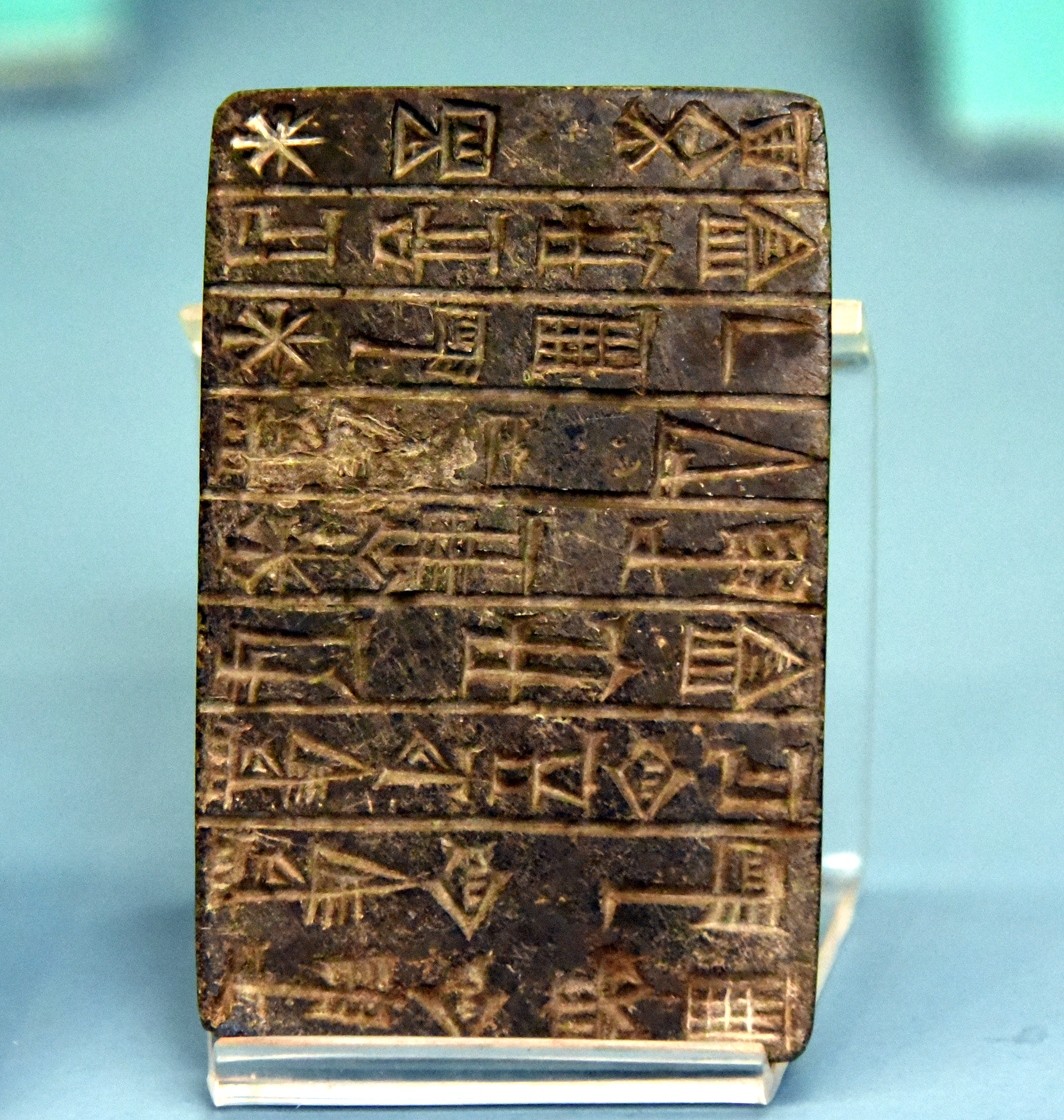
Stone tablet. Votive inscription of Shulgi, king of Ur. Mentions the dedication of the temple of E-ninnu to the god Ningirsu. From Lagash, Iraq. 21st century BCE. Ancient Orient Museum, Istanbul

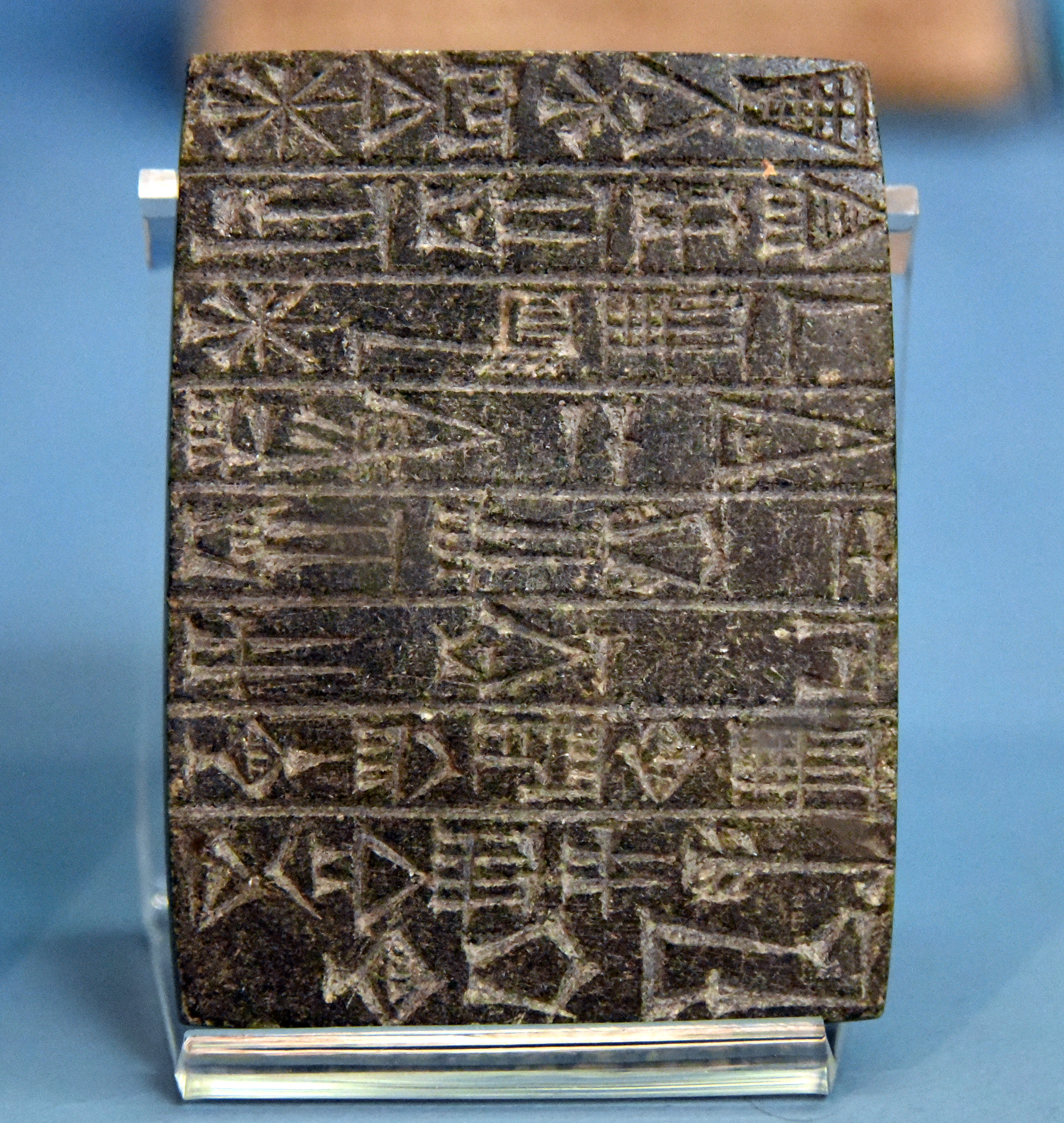
Votive inscription of Gudea, ruler of Lagash mentioning the construction of the temple of E-ninnu for Ningirsu. From Lagash, Iraq. 22nd century BCE. Ancient Orient Museum, Istanbul
