= Funerary cone =

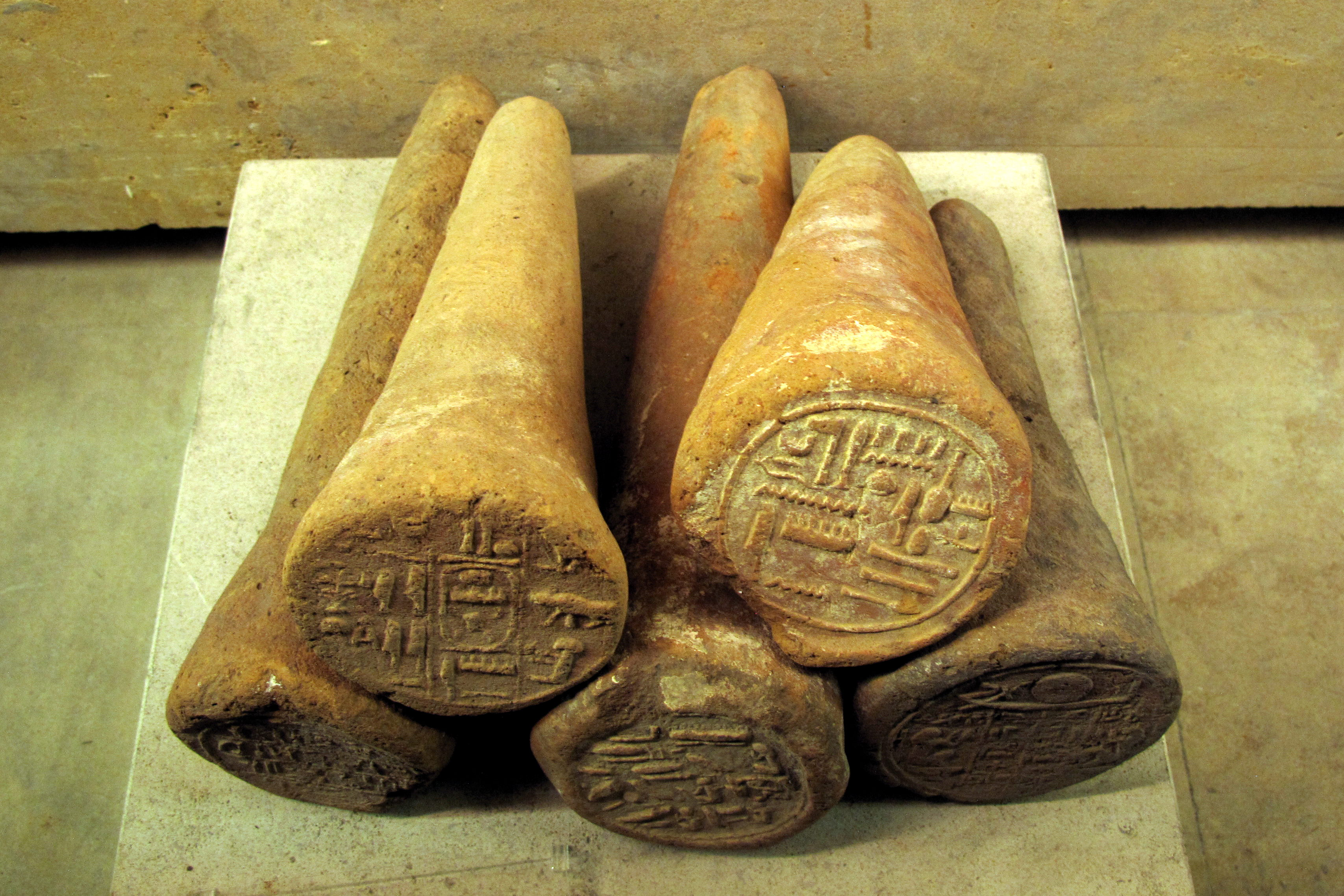
Several cones, New Kingdom

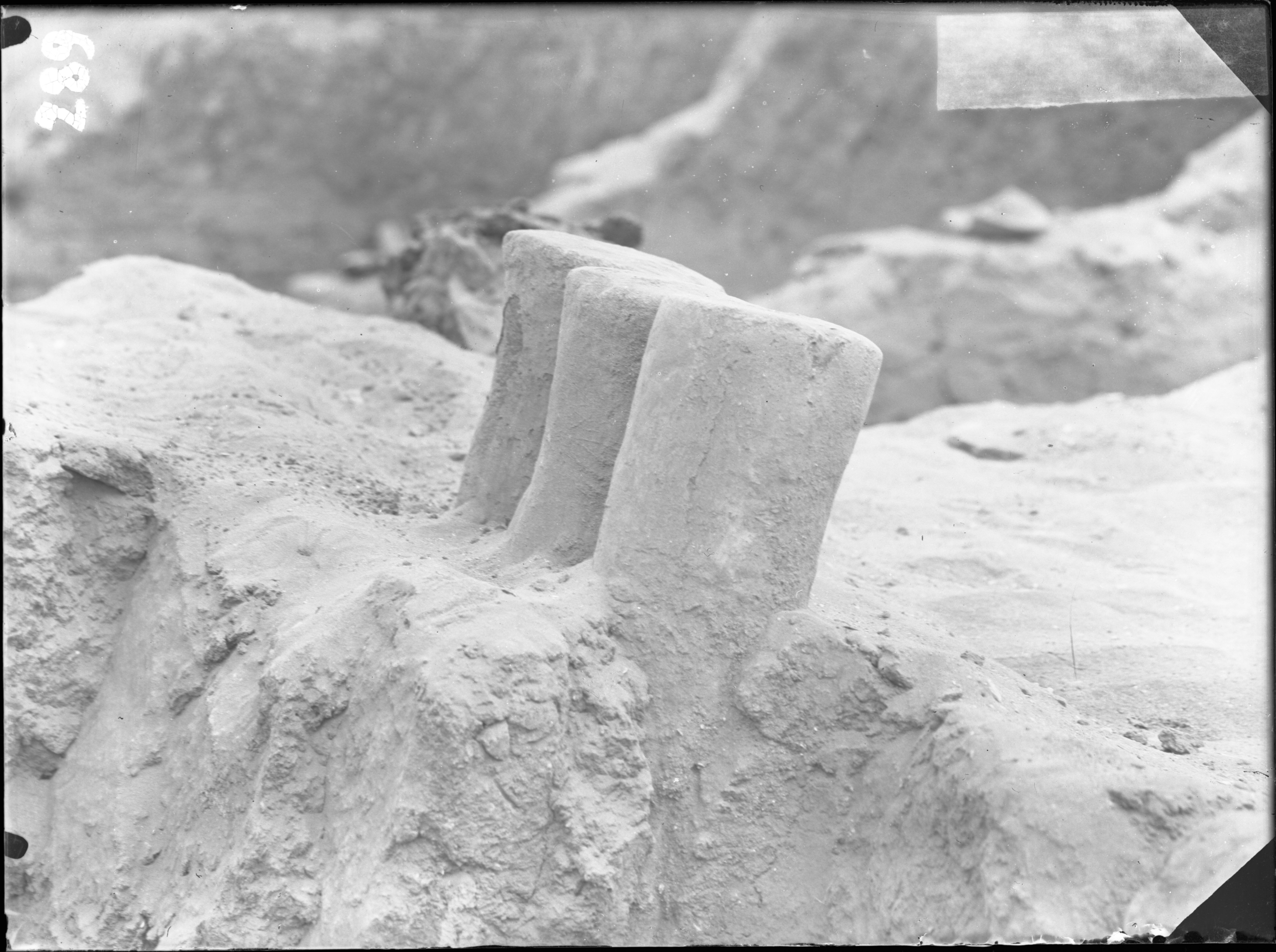
Three funerary cones still embedded in the wall where they were inserted. Tomb of Iti and Neferu, between 2118 and 1980 BC (First Intermediate Period of Egypt), Gebelein. Schiaparelli excavations, 1911.

Funerary Cone of the Overseer of Sculptors Su MET 15.10.11-acc

Funerary cones were small cones made from clay that were used in ancient Egypt, almost exclusively in the Theban Necropolis. The items were placed over the entrance of the chapel of a tomb. Early examples have been found from the Eleventh Dynasty. However, they are generally undecorated. During the New Kingdom, the cones were smaller in size and inscribed in hieroglyphs with the title and name of the tomb owner, often with a short prayer. The exact purpose of the cones is unknown, but hypotheses exist that they variously served as passports, architectural features, and symbolic offerings, among others.

Fragments of seventeen terracotta cones were found at the 2nd millennium BC site of al-Moghraqa in the Gaza Strip. The cones have no parallels in the Levant, and the archaeologists investigating al-Moghraqa suggested that the cones could have been a local adaptation of Theban funerary customs.

Funerary cones were first organized into a corpus by Davies and Macadam (1957). This catalog was later supplemented by Vivo and Costa (1997). In the 21st century, Dibley and Lipkin (2009) and Zenihiro (2009) have compiled more complete publications, with Theis (2017) contributing additional cones from books, articles, auction and exhibition catalogues for consideration.

== See also ==
- Chamber tomb
- Clay nail–(Mesopotamia)
