= Clay nail =

Ancient Mesopotamian architectural feature

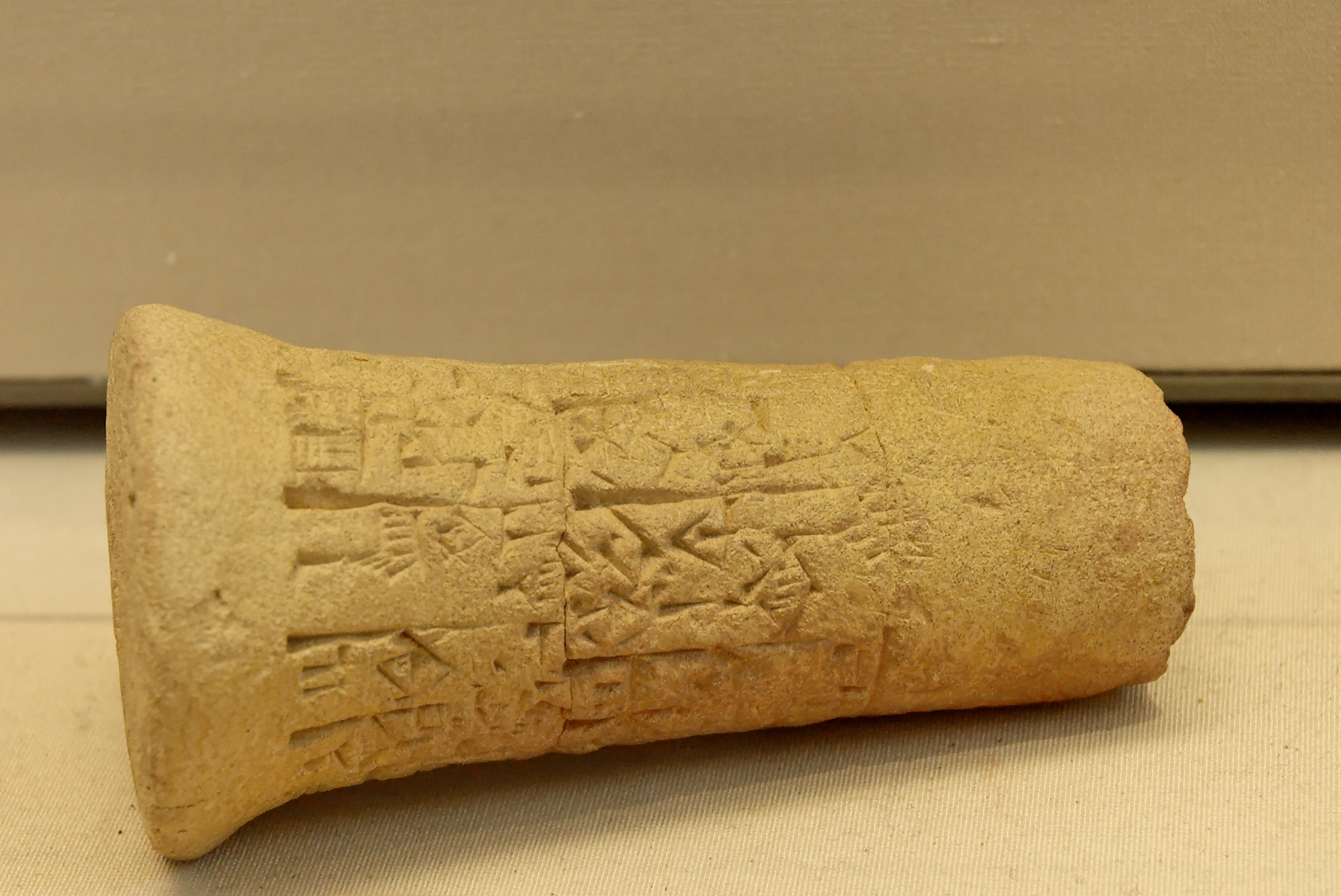
One of the oldest diplomatic documents known, by King Entemena, c 2400 BC., Louvre, Paris

Cast bronze of a deity, wearing a divine horned headdress, kneeling with a foundation peg inscribed with King Gudea's name. Though the inscription is mostly defaced, it was probably dedicated to the Ningirsu, god of the city-stade of Lagash, circa 2100 BC (Neo-Sumerian period), Dimensions: 17.7 × 4.3 × 7.2 cm, Walters Art Museum, Baltomore

Used by Sumerians and other Mesopotamian cultures beginning in the third millennium BC, clay nails, also referred to as dedication or foundation pegs, cones, or nails, were cone-shaped nails made of clay, inscribed with cuneiform, baked, and stuck into the mudbrick walls to serve as evidence that the temple or building was the divine property of the god to whom it was dedicated. Versions were also made of metal, including castings with figurative designs, such as the Hurrian foundation pegs (Syria, c. 2300 – c. 2159 BCE).

Additionally, uninscribed clay cones painted in different colors were used by Sumerians to create decorative mosaic patterns on walls and pillars of buildings, which also offered some protection against weathering.

The similar funerary cones of ancient Egypt used the cone base as the major writing surface.

== Foundation nail examples ==
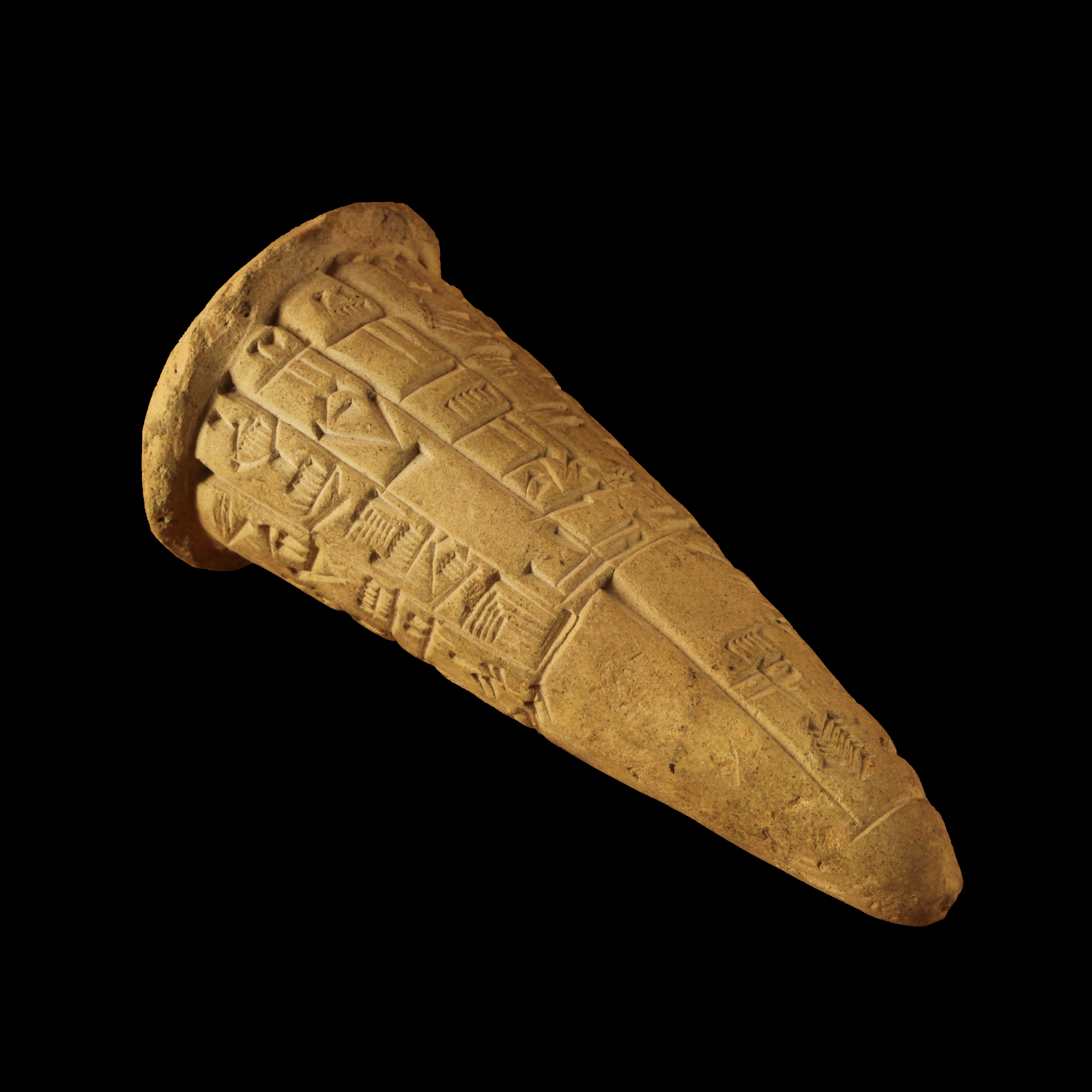
Terracotta foundation nail dedicated by King Gudea to Ningirsu for the building of his temple, the E-ninnu (House of 50), the É to the warrior god Ningirsu in the Sumerian city of Girsu in southern Mesopotamia. Insprition: "For Ningirsu, the powerful hero of Enlil, his king, Gudea, prince of Lagash, accomplished what had to be; his temple of E-innu, the shining thunder-bird, he built and restored." Ca. 2120 BC. Dimensions: height 10.7 cm, diameter 4.7 cm, Museum of Fine Arts of Lyon

As some of the oldest 'documents' in history, the sponsor, responsible for the construction, or dedication of a work, some of the oldest histories, and/or intrigues are recorded. (Boasting sometimes led to historical inaccuracies, or misstatements of facts.)

=== King Entemena ===
King Entemena's nail is a prime example of a clay nail in excellent condition, as well as possessing a detailed story. He was king of Lagash towards the late-middle of the 3rd millennium BC.

=== King Hammurabi ===
One of King Hammurabi's clay nails was acquired in March 1938 and is today in the Oriental Institute, Chicago (Inv. number A 24645). The nail “head,” although fully preserved, is missing almost the entire shaft. The head has a diameter of 187 millimeters. In comparison, the shaft at the base is 110 millimeters in diameter. Both the head and shaft are inscribed with cuneiform writing in Akkadian. There are three columns of text on the head of the nail; the first column on the upper half having dulled over the course of centuries, and the lower half of the third column broken off. There are two replicas of the clay nail with the same inscription located at the University of Pennsylvania Museum and the Oxford Museum. However, each were transliterated and translated differently. The Philadelphia version is filled with missing text, although the complication was solved with the help of the Chicago version. Simultaneously, the Oxford text gives the Sumerian version. All three clay nails are now preserved in each of their respected locations. They are easily recognized to be from the Hammurabi period due to their distinct style of having a mushroom shape, broad heads, and short shafts.

== See also ==
- Funerary cone - (ancient Egyptian)
