= Ningirsu =

Mesopotamian god

Ninĝirsu
- God of war and agriculture
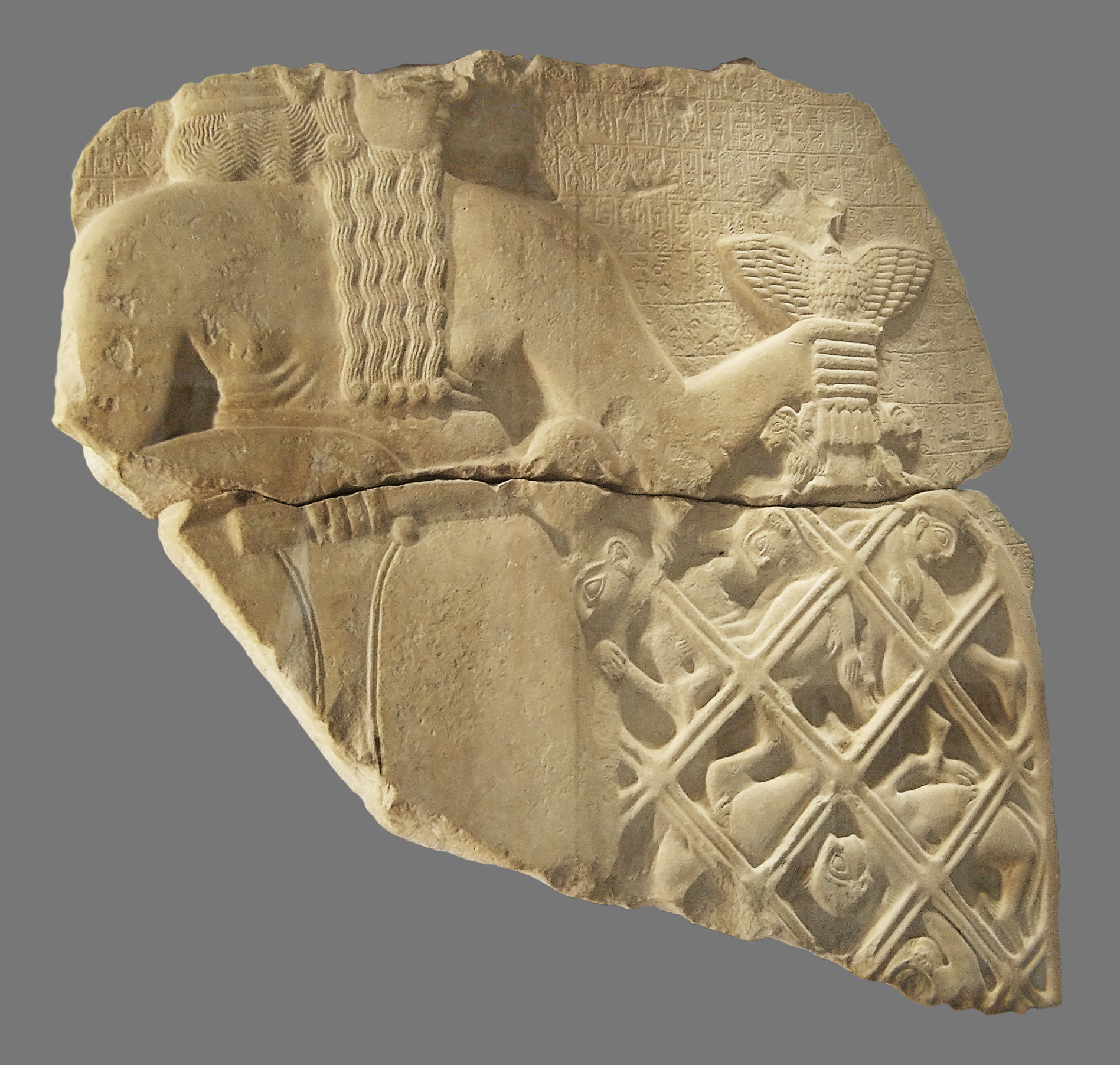
- Fragment of the Stele of Vultures showing Ninĝirsu. He holds a mace and a battle net in which men from Umma are imprisoned.The battle net is closed by his composite emblem, which represents the Anzû over two lions. Musée du Louvre.
- Major cult center: Ĝirsu
- Symbols: lion, composite emblem representing the Anzû over lions, sevenfold mace, plow

Genealogy
- Parents: Enlil and Ninhursag
- Siblings: Nanshe
- Consort: Bau
- Offspring: Igalim, Shulshaga, seven daughters including Ḫegirnuna and Urnunta-ea

Ninĝirsu (in cuneiform writing: 𒀭𒊩𒌆𒄊𒋢 "Nin-Gir_{2}-Su" written with cuneiform signs SAL.TUG2-GIR-SU) was a Mesopotamian god regarded as the tutelary deity of the city of Ĝirsu, and as the chief god of the local pantheon of the state of Lagash. He shares many aspects with the god Ninurta. Ninĝirsu was identified as a local hypostasis of Ninurta in a syncretism that is documented at the latest by the time of Gudea in the late third millennium BC. Assyriologists are divided on the question of whether they were originally two manifestations of the same god, or two separate deities.

Ninĝirsu's two main aspects were that of a warlike god, and that of a god connected with agricultural fertility. In Lagash, he was particularly associated with a composite emblem depicting the Anzû bird over two lions. It could sometimes represent him in cultic contexts.

Ninĝirsu was an important local god from the Early Dynastic Period until the old Babylonian period. He was regarded as the son of Enlil and Ninhursag; several scholars have proposed that in an older tradition he was regarded as a son of Enki. Ninĝirsu's sister was Nanshe; she was the second main deity in the pantheon of Lagash. His wife was Bau; it has been argued that from the time of Gudea she replaced Nanshe as the highest ranking goddess, and was elevated to equal rank with her husband. Their children were the gods Igalim and Shulshaga, and seven goddesses including Ḫegirnuna and Urnunta-ea.

The decline of the region of origin of Ninĝirsu participated in the decline of his cult, and his identity was subsumed by Ninurta. This is notably attested by the presence of Ninĝirsu as the protagonist of Old Babylonian versions of the myths Lugale and the Epic of Anzû, while the Standard Babylonian version features Ninurta instead. The influence of local Lagashite mythology on Lugale has been interpreted either as evidence of the syncretism between Ninurta and Ninĝirsu at the time of its composition, or as evidence that Ninĝirsu was the protagonist of the myth in an older tradition.

== Ninĝirsu and Ninurta ==
The question of whether Ninĝirsu and Ninurta were originally two separate deities or two aspects of the same god is a subject of debate in Assyriology. Michael P. Streck points out that they appear separately in the early god lists. Ninurta appears in a higher position in the Fāra god list and Ninĝirsu appears in a higher position in the Abu Salabikh god list. He suggests that this could indicate two originally separate deities that were syncretized at some point in the second half of the third millennium BC due to the similarities between their characters.

Thorkild Jacobsen interpreted Ninurta and Ninĝirsu as two names of the same god, and theorized that he was originally identical to the Anzû bird that he is often associated with. Jerrold S. Cooper also sees Ninĝirsu as a local manifestation of Ninurta and underlines his connection with Nippur, Ninurta's cult center, in Early Dynastic texts from Lagash. Scholars holding the opposite opinion include Adam Falkenstein, who saw indications that Ninĝirsu and Ninurta initially had different genealogies, and that Ninĝirsu was a son of Enki in an older tradition. J. Van Dijk argues that Ninĝirsu and Ninurta had partially different attributes before they were syncretized, and Jeremy Black also interpreted them as two gods from different cult centers in origin.

The majority of scholars agree that syncretism between Ninĝirsu and Ninurta is attested at least by the time of Gudea, when local mythology began to be reinterpreted as national mythology. This is notably suggested by the parallels between the weapons and trophies of Ninĝirsu in the Gudea Cylinders and the ones of Ninurta in the myths Angim and Lugale. A syncretism dating to the Akkadian period has been proposed. After the decline of his region of origin, mentions of Ninĝirsu become rarer. He is substituted by Ninurta in the first millennium versions of the myths Lugale and the Epic of Anzu.

== Name and attributes ==
The name of the god, commonly written in cuneiform as 𒀭𒎏𒄈𒋢 ^{d}nin-ĝír-su(-k), means ‘’Lord of Ĝirsu.’’ Ĝirsu was the capital of the state of Lagash in historical times, and the principal cult center of Ninĝirsu. As tutelary god of Ĝirsu and its region, Ninĝirsu was believed to be the owner of the land, and the mortal ruler was believed to administer his domain on his behalf.

In the earliest sources, the most characteristic attribute of Ninĝirsu was that of a warlike god. A common epithet of his was ‘’warrior of Enlil’’. It is first attested in the Early Dynastic Period inscriptions of the rulers of Lagash in the context of their multigenerational border war with the rival state of Umma. Ninĝirsu was believed to appoint the rulers of Lagash to defend his territory against claims of the ruler of Umma. He could be described as intervening personally on the battlefield in their favour. In the inscriptions of Gudea, Ninĝirsu appears chiefly as a warlike deity. His destructive aspect was frequently compared to forces of nature such as storms and floods. Gudea envisioned the god ''enormous as the heavens, enormous as the earth'', with wings like those of the Anzû bird and his lower body like a flood storm.

Because of this association with storms and floods Thorkild Jacobsen interpreted Ninurta/Ninĝirsu as a god of thunderstorms. He theorized that the Anzû bird that this god was often associated with was originally a divine representation of a stormcloud and that they were initially identical. However, Michael P. Streck remarks that metaphors relating to forces of nature are attested for other warlike deities, and Frans Wiggermann instead theorizes that the Anzû bird was originally the symbol of the god Enlil, and that it came to be associated with Ninĝirsu because he acted under the supervision of Enlil's authority.

In the inscriptions of Gudea Sharur is identified as the main weapon of Ninĝirsu; it was also the main weapon of Ninurta. Claudia E. Suter proposes that Sharur might have been depicted as a giant mace on a fragment of a monument from the time of Gudea.

Ninĝirsu was also a god associated with agricultural fertility. The Sumerian literary text ‘’The Lagash King List’’, dated to the Old Babylonian period, seemingly credits him for the creation of the tools of agriculture, the irrigation system, and for the ensued prosperity for the region of Lagash. In the later version of the Epic of Anzû, it is stated that Ninurta's name in the furrows is Ninĝirsu, and the god is described as a source of abundance who resettles devastated agricultural lands in the syncretistic Hymn to Gula, a literary text perhaps originally composed in the Kassite period. Some researchers presume that this attribute of Ninĝirsu was acquired in the syncretism with Ninurta.

Ninĝirsu received offerings in the context of the cult of the dead; Gebhard J. Selz interprets this as evidence of his role as an underworld deity. Michael P. Streck considers instead that his presence in the offering lists is more likely tied to his role as a city god.

== Iconography ==
Visual depictions of Ninĝirsu usually reflect his function as a warrior deity. On the Stele of the Vultures, the god is depicted as a massive figure intervening on the battlefield in favour of the ruler. He is shown holding a mace and a battle net, in which defeated enemies of the rival state of Umma are imprisoned. On the lower register of the stele he stands on a war chariot pulled by lions.

Ninĝirsu was associated with the lion. He shared this symbol with various other warrior deities. A type of iconography restricted to the region of Ĝirsu, from the Neo-sumerian period, depicts a god with lion protomes rising from his shoulders; he is identified as Ninĝirsu.

Another symbol of Ninĝirsu was a composite emblem representing the Anzû bird over lions. It appears on objects dedicated to the god and is rarely seen outside of Lagash. It is represented in Ninĝirsu's hand on the Stele of the vultures, closing his battle net, and on the lower register of the stele, where it is attached to his chariot, separated from the lions. It also appears on a fragment from a stele of Gudea. It could be sometimes used to represent the god in cultic contexts.

Ninĝirsu was often associated with the Anzû bird in both textual and visual sources from the Early Dynastic Period until the Neo Sumerian period, though the mythical creature could also be connected with other deities. The Anzû’s relationship to the god is ambiguous in the Cylinders of Gudea. It is frequently mentioned, twice as his emblem. Ninĝirsu is described as a god resembling the Anzû in the dream of Gudea, and Ninĝirsu's temple E-ninnu is frequently mentioned by its epithet ‘’the White Anzû bird’’. It could be compared to or equated with the mythical creature. The Anzû is absent from the list of Ninĝirsu's trophies, while in the Old Babylonian Epic of Anzû, it is the defeated enemy of Ninĝirsu, and it appears as a trophy of the god in Sumerian literary texts. Frans Wiggerman suggests that the characterization of the Anzû evolved from an ally to a defeated enemy of the god with time. He also argues that the Anzû was originally the symbol of Enlil, and that the symbol of Ninĝirsu was actually the lion, while his association with the Anzû was connected to his status as the warrior of Enlil.

The sevenfold mace was an attribute of Ninĝirsu in the Neo Sumerian Period. It is mentioned in the Cylinder Inscriptions among the weapons gifted to his temple E-ninnu, and he is depicted wielding it on the seal of the priest Ur-Dun. Eva Andrea Holzinger-Braun proposes that since representations of this type of weapon are only attested in Ĝirsu, images of warrior gods holding the sevenfold mace could be identified as representations of Ninĝirsu.

A kudurru from the Kassite period names the plow as Ninĝirsu's symbol.

== Association with other deities ==
Ninĝirsu's sister was Nanshe. Inscriptions of the rulers of Lagash frequently mention them together; this was a sign of her status as the second main deity in the local pantheon. For example, Enmetena restored the dais at Namnundakigarra ‘’for the master who loves him, the god Ninĝirsu, and for the mistress who loves him, the goddess Nanshe’’, and in his inscriptions Gudea states that he follows the justice ordained by Nanshe and Ninĝirsu. Ninĝirsu was worshipped in the E-nineĝarra, ‘’the House placed by the Sister’’ in Niĝin, Nanshe's cult center, and Nanshe was worshipped in the E-šešeĝarra, ‘’the House placed by the Brother’’ in Ĝirsu.

Enlil was regarded as Ninĝirsu's father. In the literary composition inscribed on the Cylinders of Gudea Ninĝirsu calls the god his biological father, and states that Enlil invested him as a warrior. Ninĝirsu's status as the warrior of Enlil dates back to the Early Dynastic Period. In the earliest sources this epithet of the god appears in the context of Lagash's border conflict with the neighbouring state of Umma. Ninĝirsu could be described as enforcing the will of Enlil by fighting forces of the ruler of Umma on the battlefield. While there is no known sources naming Ninĝirsu as the son of Enlil in the Early Dynastic Period, this tradition of filiation already existed at the time. It is attested by the name of a temple of Enlil in the region of Lagash, the é-adda, ‘’the house of the father’’, which is known from the inscriptions of Enmetena.

Several scholars see indications that Ninĝirsu was originally regarded as the son of Enki. They underline the fact that Nanshe, the sister of Ninĝirsu, was regarded as a daughter of Enki. A connection between Enki and Ningirsu has also been proposed based on some Early Dynastic period royal inscriptions. In particular, it has been observed that Urukagina calls Ninĝirsu's wife Bau “daughter in law of Eridu”. Claudia E. Suter suggests that this connection could also potentially be reflected in some passages of the Gudea Cylinders. Michael P. Streck remarks however that there are no known references to Enki as Ninĝirsu's father, which makes the hypothesis uncertain.

Ninhursag was regarded as the mother of Ninĝirsu in the inscriptions of Gudea. An oblique statement on Ninĝirsu's birth refers to her: ‘’Born by the mountain, nursed with the healthy milk of a hind‘’. In Lagash she was Enlil's wife, though in a later tradition she is considered his sister instead. She was already worshipped in early dynastic Lagash.

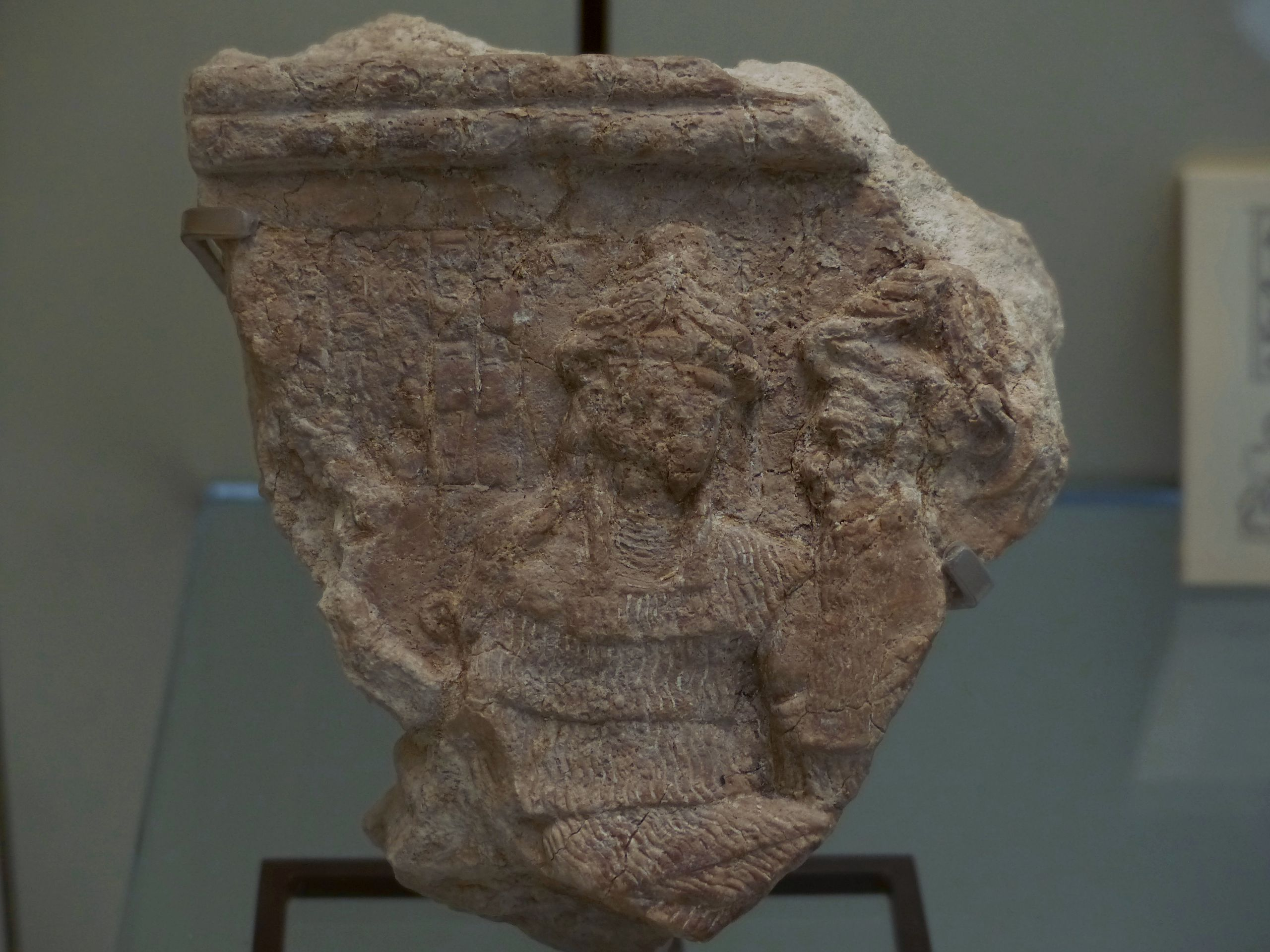
Fragment of a votive relief to the life of Gudea showing Bau and Ningirsu. Musée du Louvre.

Ninĝirsu's wife was Bau. They are representative of a type of Mesopotamian divine couple consisting of a warrior god and a healer goddess. Another example is Ninisina and Pabilsag. While in the Early Dynastic Period Nanshe was the highest ranking goddess of the pantheon of Lagash, Julia M. Asher-Greve argues that from the time of Gudea Bau replaced her in this role, and that she was elevated to equal rank with her husband by this ruler. A votive relief to the life of Gudea shows Bau sitting in Ninĝirsu's lap; according to Julia M. Asher-Greve, this kind of depiction emphasized both the pair's ability to act in unison and the ruler's special connection to them. A traditional cultic event in Lagash celebrated their marriage. From the Old Babylonian period the cult of Bau was introduced in Kish, and in this city she was regarded as the wife of the local war god Zababa. Both pairings appear separately in Tablet V of the god list An=Anum, and the pairing of Bau with Zababa eventually became more common from the middle Babylonian period onwards.

The gods Igalim and Shulshaga were the sons of Bau and Ninĝirsu.

In the Cylinder B of Gudea, the goddesses Zazaru, IM-pa'e, Urnunta-ea, Ḫegirnuna, Ḫesaga, Zurmu and Zarmu are regarded as their daughters. They were referred to as Bau's seven daughters and Ninĝirsu's unruly children, as well as Ninĝirsu's beloved lukur-priestesses. Ḫegirnuna was already called ‘’the beloved lukur priestess of Ninĝirsu’’ in the inscriptions of Urukagina. Urnunta-ea could be identified as a child of Lisin in an alternative tradition, as attested by tablet II, line 77 of the god list An=Anum. It has also been suggested that the single divine name Zurmuzarmu in tablet II line 105 of An=Anum in the section of the pantheon of Kesh was directly connected to the earlier goddesses Zurmu and Zarmu.

An was the father in law of Ningirsu. In the Gudea Cylinders, Ninĝirsu states that An invested him with the role of ishib (purification priest). Some of the dedicatory gifts he is offered at the inauguration of the E-ninnu refer to this role; precious metals and stones, as well as cult vessels to be brought on an offering table.

The goddess Ninsar is called the butcher of Ninĝirsu by Urukagina.

Ningishzida was regarded as a close companion of Ninĝirsu by Gudea. While these gods originally had no relationship to each other, in the inscriptions of this ruler Ningishzida is described as participating in the traditional celebrations of Ninĝirsu's marriage to Bau. He delivers Ninĝirsu's bridal gifts to her, a role usually reserved to friends of the groom.

== Worship ==
=== Early attestations ===
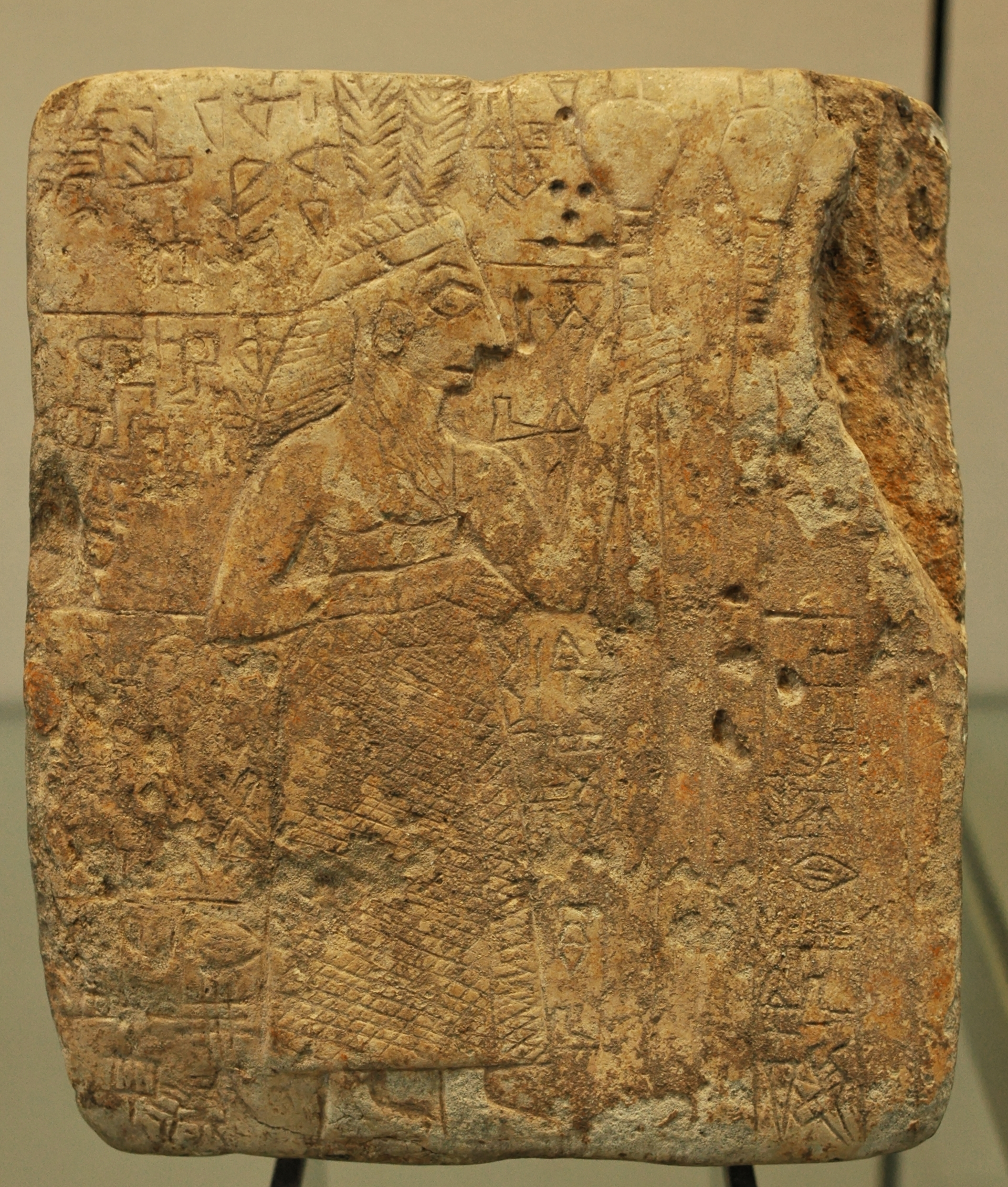
The "Figure aux Plumes". The figure represented has been variously interpreted as a priest-king or as Ninĝirsu. Musée du Louvre.

The earliest known mention of Ninĝirsu and his temple in Ĝirsu comes from the ‘’Figure aux Plumes’’, a monument dated to the Early Dynastic II period (2700–2600 BC). The cuneiform inscription on the monument is regarded as difficult to understand by Assyriologists. The text presents parallels with literary texts, and also resembles land sale documents. The figure depicted has been interpreted by Rita Dolce as being more likely the representation of the leader of the community rather than a god, while Gianni Marchesi and Nicolo Marchetti instead argue for an identification with Ninĝirsu. The headdress that he wears has been variously understood by scholars as either composed of feathers, or vegetal ornamentation.

Ninĝirsu is attested in the early god lists from Fāra and Abu Salabikh, from the same period.

The god is also mentioned in the Zame Hymns. He is preceded there by both Gatumdug, the city goddess of Lagash, and Nanshe.

Most of the temples of Ninĝirsu were located within the territory of Lagash. The most important temple dedicated to him was the E-ninnu, “The house of fifty’’, in Ĝirsu. The god's shrine inside the E-ninnu was the E-Ĝirnun (‘’House of the princely path’’); it is already attested in the Zame Hymns. In the city of Lagash itself, Ninĝirsu was worshipped in the E-Bagara, the ‘’House of Bagara’’.

=== First dynasty of Lagash ===
The earliest ruler of Lagash for which we have a sufficient number of inscriptions, Ur-Nanshe, commemorated his building of several temples of Ninĝirsu, including the E-ninnu and the E-Bagara. He built for the god the shrine E-Ĝidru (‘’House of the Spectre’’), as well as the E-Tiraš, (‘’House of Tirash’’) a temple in the yet unidentified settlement of Tiraš in the region. Douglas Frayne proposes that the temple settlement at Tiraš served a defensive role in Lagash's border conflict with Umma. The E-nineĝarra, Ninĝirsu's temple in Niĝin, was also built by this ruler.

Akurgal built the temple E-Antasura (‘’House which Twinkles from Heaven’’) for Ninĝirsu. This temple was located in a settlement on the border with Umma. It gave its name to the surrounding district disputed by this neighbour. Gebhard Selz suggests that due to this location in a disputed area the temple likely functioned as a military outpost. He proposes that the later epithet ‘’Temple whose gleam of terror lies on all foreign lands’’ given to the E-Antasura by Enmetena was a reference to this role.

Eannatum restored the E-Tirash. He built for Ninĝirsu a shrine bearing either the name or the epithet E-za, ‘’the House of Stone’’, out of silver and lapis lazuli, and a storehouse made of alabaster stone where he amassed grain for the god. A dais was also erected at Namnundakigarra for him. He constructed the canal Lummagimdu (‘’Sweet like Lumma’’) on behalf of Ninĝirsu and gifted it to the god after his military victories against Umma. The earliest known mention of Ninĝirsu's epithet “warrior of Enlil” comes from the inscriptions of Eannatum. A victory stele from the time of this ruler documents the phase of the border conflict between Lagash and Umma that took place under his rule. It was fought over a piece of agricultural land, the Guedena. In the inscriptions of Eannatum the Guedena is repeatedly referred to as “Ninĝirsu's beloved field”. It was believed by the Lagashites to be the property of this god. The retrieval of the disputed territory is depicted as a divine mission from Ninĝirsu in the inscriptions of Eannatum. The inscription on the Stele of the Vultures relates that Ninĝirsu created Eannatum, described as a figure of superhuman size and strength, to be his champion, and that he gave him the kingship of Lagash “with great joy”. The god then sent him a dream promising victory and the death of his enemy, the ruler of Umma. After his military victories, Eannatum erected a stele on the Guedena and gifted the Lummagimdu canal to the god. Ninĝirsu is invoked in a curse against any ruler of Umma who would trespass again into the territory of Lagash.

Enannatum I built for Ninĝirsu the shrine Ešdugru, ‘’the Sanctuary in which jars are deposited’’ and brought white cedars that he planted for an unnamed temple of the god. He also brought white cedars for its roof, and placed lions made of wood as its doorkeepers. His reign saw the renewal of the conflict between Lagash and Umma. The inscriptions of Enannatum I relate that the new ruler of Umma, Ur-Lumma, transgressed the boundary of Ninĝirsu, provoking the anger of the god. In one of them Ninĝirsu is described as the god who nominated him, granted him strength, and put all the foreign lands under his control. Ur-Lumma was eventually repelled in unclear circumstances, as while Enannatum I fought him in battle, his son and successor Enmetena claimed credit for the victory. A later account of the battle from Urukagina attributes the destruction of the Ummaite forces to Ninĝirsu himself.

Enmetena built for Ninĝirsu the A-Huš ,‘’Fearsome house’’ and rebuilt the Ešdugru. He restored the Palace of Antasura for the god, decorated it with gold and silver, and furnished his sanctuary E-ša (‘’House of the Heart’’ or ‘’Inner Chamber’’) with a garden and a well of fired bricks. The location of E-ša is uncertain; it could have been a part of the settlement of Antasura or a neighbouring settlement. Enmetena restored the E-ninnu. The dais at Namnundakigarra, which had been destroyed in the conflict with Umma, was rebuilt by this ruler in the name of Ninĝirsu and Nanshe. A chariot was among the votive gifts that Enmetena consecrated to Ninĝirsu. This ruler left a monument that gives an account of the history of the Lagash Umma conflict from Lagash's point of view. In its inscription, Ninĝirsu is described as fighting Umma on the battlefield at the command of Enlil after the rival state invaded the territory of Lagash. The border between the two states was understood to have a divine origin. The text relates that it was demarcated by Enlil, the head of the gods, between Ninĝirsu, the chief god of Lagash, and Shara, the chief god of Umma. In his inscriptions, Enmetena refers to himself as the nominee of Ninĝirsu, and as the man who took up the mission from the gods. He fought and defeated Ur-Lumma, and successfully opposed his successor Il. Ninĝirsu is invoked in a curse against any future rulers of Umma who cross the border with Lagash with the intention of stealing fields.

In his “Reform Texts”, Urukagina, the last pre-sargonic ruler of Lagash, claims to have corrected various past abuses in the land of Lagash after being chosen by Ninĝirsu for this mission. He claims to have restituted estates and fields to Ninĝirsu and other gods, and to have made a binding agreement with Ninĝirsu regarding the protection of disadvantaged groups such as widows and orphans. There have been differing interpretations of the ‘’Reform’’ texts in scholarship; it has been suggested that their purpose was actually to strengthen the ruler's power. Urukagina restored the E-ninnu, the E-Tiraš, as well as the E-Ĝidru and the Antasura. The E-kal (‘’Precious house’’) was a shrine built for Ninĝirsu by this ruler. Many of Ninĝirsu's temples and shrines were plundered during the invasion of Lagash led by the rival ruler Lugalzagesi of Umma, including the E-Antasura, the A-Huš, the Ešdugru, the E-Tiraš, and the E-Bagara.

=== Neo Sumerian Period ===
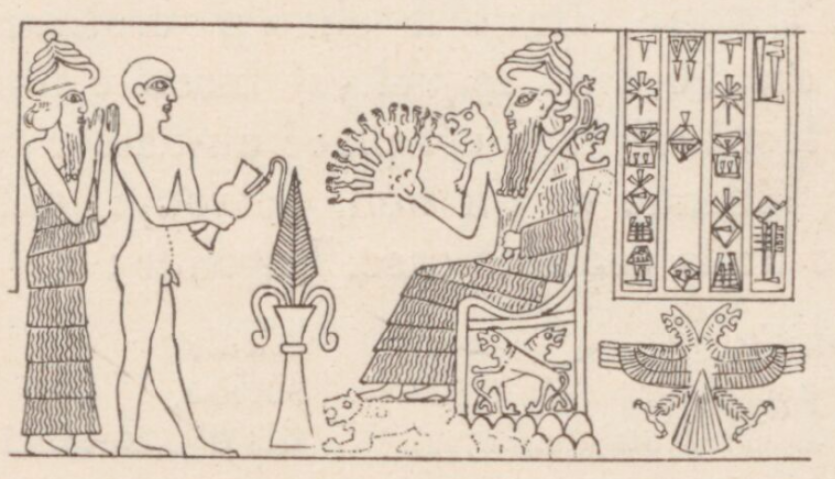
Enthroned Ninĝirsu with the sevenfold mace on the cylinder seal of the priest Ur-DUN. From Catalogue des cylindres, cachets et pierres gravées de style oriental: Musée du Louvre.(1920) Louis-Joseph Delaporte.

The worship of Ninĝirsu continued in the Akkadian and Ur III periods. Lagash was an important and prosperous territory at the time. The Neo Sumerian ruler of Lagash Gudea restored the E-ninnu. This event was the subject of a literary composition, the longest known in the Sumerian language, which he inscribed on two Cylinders. Gudea brought copper, wood, stone, silver, gold, carnelian, and alabaster from regions outside of Mesopotamia to rebuild the E-ninnu. Some features of the temple of Ninĝirsu that differed from the standard model of a Mesopotamian temple were the presence of an armory, trophies and weapons. The inscriptions of the Cylinders relate that Gudea fashioned two chariots for Ninĝirsu. They were pulled by donkeys. The one offered to Ninĝirsu during the process of the temple building was described as being made of wood and adorned with silver and lapis lazuli. The chariot included an emblem on which Ninĝirsu's name was written, and weapons. The second chariot was brought to the temple during the inauguration festivities. The emblem on both chariots likely represented the Anzû.

A statue of Gudea in the guise of an architect was fashioned in dark green diorite and dedicated to Ninĝirsu in the E-ninnu. The inscription on it mentions that it was accompanied by regular offerings of beer, bread, flour, and emmer. Booty from Gudea's military victories over Anshan and Elam were brought to Ĝirsu and donated to the god in the E-ninnu. The weapons Sharur and Shargaz were fashioned for Ninĝirsu. Copper, diorite, and gold were brought to fashion maces and a quiver for the god.

With the end of the second dynasty of Lagash the territory was integrated as part of the Ur III state. The Ur III ruler Shulgi commemorated his restoration of Ninĝirsu ‘s E-ninnu and E-Bagara temples in his inscriptions.

=== Cult personnel, festivals, and personal worship ===
The highest ranking office in the cult of Ninĝirsu was the ishib priest. In the third millennium he participated in one of the most important Mesopotamian sacred rituals. This ritual allowed the statue of a god to act as its living incarnation. It consisted of two rites, the rite of ‘‘the washing of the mouth’’ of the statue, followed by the rite of ‘’the opening of the mouth’’ of the statue. The cult of Ninĝirsu included gudu priests. The duties of gudu priests included the performing of lustration rites, sacrifices and the care and feeding of gods. Liturgical priests such as the nar (musician singers) and the gala are also attested as part of the clergy of Ninĝirsu, as are a class of priestesses called lukur. There is little evidence on the role of lukur priestesses, and the few there is indicates that it likely differed depending on the city. It has been suggested that their duties might have included the care of deities. It is known that the lukurs of Ninĝirsu could marry and have children.

Ninĝirsu was connected to two important festivals in the state of Lagash; the Festival of Barley eating in the fourth month and the Festival of Malt eating in the tenth month. They were connected to a bathing ritual.

Personal names invoking Ninĝirsu could either be formed directly with his name, or with the word en, ‘’lord’’. Ur-Ninĝirsu (most likely meaning ‘’Dog of Ninĝirsu’’) was one of the most common personal names in the territory of Lagash. Some other personal names invoking Ninĝirsu from documents of pre-Sargonic Lagash include Ninĝirsu-Anzû (‘’Ninĝirsu is the Anzû’’), Ninĝirsu-menzi (‘’Ninĝirsu with the righteous diadem’’), Enudana (‘’Lord in his storm’’), En-Nanshe-kiag (‘’Lord loved by Nanshe’’), Ninĝirsu-badgu (‘’Ningirsu is my city wall’’), Enmussazi (‘’Lord righteous son in law’’), Ensheku (‘’Lord who brings in the barley’’), Engisa (‘’Enduring lord’’), Ninĝirsu-igidu (‘’Ningirsu goes at the fore’’), and Ninĝirsu-teshgu (‘’Ninĝirsu is my dignity’’).

=== Late attestations ===
After the collapse of the Ur III state, the region of Lagash declined, and would never recover its former political importance. This resulted in the fading away of the cult of its gods. Mentions of Ninĝirsu become more rare afterwards.

Royal inscriptions from the dynasty of Larsa attest to the patronage given by these rulers to the region of Lagash and its temples. Ninĝirsu is invoked in the curse section of an inscription of Abi-sare. Two cadastres recording inventories of land belonging to the temple of Ninĝirsu attest to its functioning about two centuries after the fall of Ur, either due to the survival of its institutions or to their renovation by Rim-Sin. A few theophoric personal names invoking the god appear there.The E-ninnu was provisioned by Hammurabi, and Lagash and Ĝirsu were among the cities that this ruler claimed patronage of.

The god appears in cult titles and onomastica in Kish as late as the reign of Samsuditana.

He is only mentioned once at the end of an offering list from the dynasty of the Sealand. With the notable exception of Nanshe, the Lagashite pantheon is absent from their sources, and it does not seem like the region of Lagash played a leading role in the kingdom. Ninĝirsu is invoked alongside Bau in the curse section of two kudurrus from the Middle Babylonian Period.

Tablet V of the god list An=Anum, originally composed in the Middle Babylonian Period, mentions Ninĝirsu in a section chiefly dealing with local deities, separately from Ninurta with whom he is usually equated.

== In Literature ==
=== The Gudea Cylinders ===
The god plays a central role in the literary composition inscribed on the Gudea Cylinders. The text recounts Gudea's rebuilding of the E-ninnu, Ninĝirsu's chief temple. It is the longest literary composition known in Sumerian. The first part focuses on the construction of the temple, and the second on its inauguration.

After Enlil determines a favorable destiny for the project, Ninĝirsu chooses Gudea to carry it out and conveys his intentions to him in a dream. The ruler then visits Ninĝirsu ‘s sister Nanshe, goddess of divination; she interprets the images of his dream one by one and then instructs him to build a chariot to ensure her brother's continued favour. To obtain instructions on the manner of building the temple, Gudea offers animals and incense at one of the gates of the E-ninnu, and prays in the temple. As a reply, Ninĝirsu sends him another dream, which this time the ruler interprets through extispicy. Gudea then builds the temple, after a ritual purification of the grounds and of the material used for the construction. Ninĝirsu's main weapon Sharur as well as his trophies are installed in the courtyard of the temple. The newly rebuilt E-ninnu is then described in great detail and Gudea, his personal god Ningishzida, and Ninĝirsu are credited for its construction. Ninĝirsu and Bau then enter their newly built house, and the god appoints his divine staff. Gudea offers economic products, as well as dedicatory gifts to the god which reflect his double role as the warrior of Enlil and ishib priest of An; a chariot and weapons, as well as various precious metals, stones and cult vessels. The temple building is inaugurated with a banquet and festivities. At the end, in a partially damaged section, Ninĝirsu gives a speech where he praises Gudea for his accomplishments, praises the E-ninnu itself, and determines the destiny of the temple. Enki, and perhaps Enlil in a possible reconstruction of the damaged passages, then respond by blessing the temple and its builder.

=== Lugale and the Epic of Anzu ===
The Old Babylonian version of the myths Lugale and Epic of Anzû feature Ninĝirsu as the protagonist, while the Standard Babylonian version features Ninurta. In the Epic of Anzû, the Anzû bird steals the tablet of destinies from Enlil. The gods Adad, Girra, and Shara decline to fight him, and it is Ninĝirsu/Ninurta who eventually defeats him. In Lugale, Ninĝirsu/Ninurta ventures to fight Asag, a demon who lives in the mountains and threatens his rule over Sumer. He is assisted by his personified weapon, Sharur. After his victory, he reorganizes the land and determines the destiny of his dead opponent and of his stone warriors, assigning blessings and curses depending on whether they allied with him or opposed him in his struggle. He is rewarded and celebrated by Enlil on his return.

It has been remarked that Lugale is strongly influenced by the local mythology of Lagash. A version of the myth originating in Nippur, Ninurta's main cult center, names Ninĝirsu and his wife Bau, the E-ninnu is mentioned and the Tigris is the river whose story is told. The Lagashite influences in Lugale has been understood either as evidence that Ninurta and Ninĝirsu were regarded as the same deity at the time of its composition, or as a sign that Ninĝirsu was the protagonist of the myth in an older tradition.

=== Other compositions ===
One of the sections of the Temple Hymns of Enheduanna is dedicated to Ninĝirsu and his temple E-ninnu (lines 240–262).

Ninĝirsu appears in the Lament for Sumer and Ur, a composition whose central theme is the destruction of cities as a result of a divine decision, and whose historical background is the fall of the Third Dynasty of Ur. He is among the tutelary deities that are forced to leave their cities during the events.
