= First Dynasty =

First Dynasty may refer to:

- The First Dynasty of Egypt (c. 3500–2900 BC)
- The First Dynasty of Kish (c. 3000–2600 BC)
- The First Dynasty of Uruk (c. 2700–2500 BC)
- The First Dynasty of Ur (c. 2600–2500 BC)
- The First Dynasty of Lagash (c. 2500–2300 BC)
- The First Babylonian dynasty (c. 1830 BC–c. 1531 BC)
