= Pre-dynastic period =

Pre-dynastic period may refer to:

- Pre-dynastic period of Sumer
- Pre-dynastic period of Egypt
