= History of Sumer =

- 4500 BC – 2000 BC
| Neolithic in the Near East | Akkadian Empire and Old Babylonian Empire |
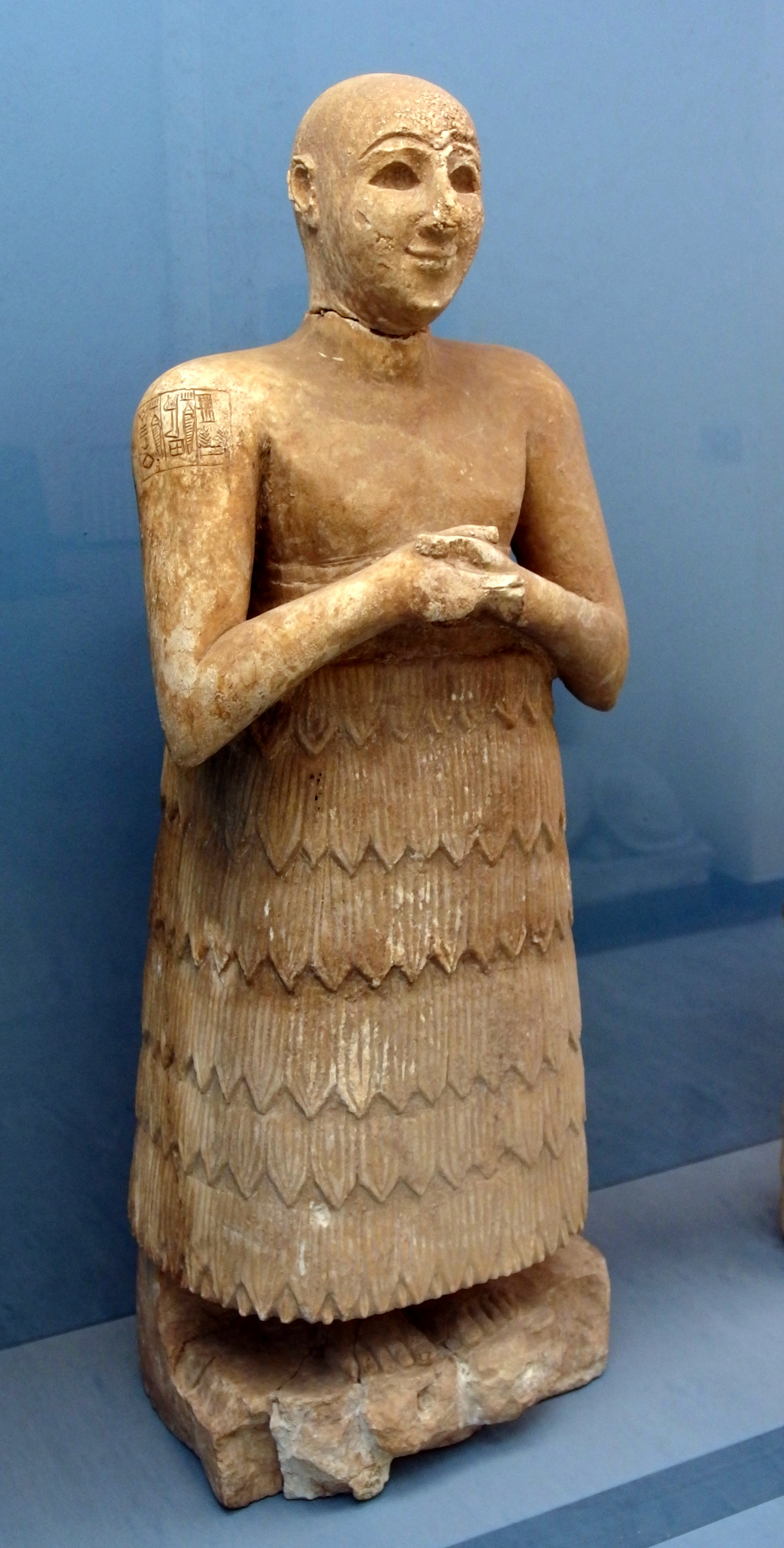
- Lugaldalu, king of Adab, circa 2500 BCE
- Location: Southern Irak and neighboring regions

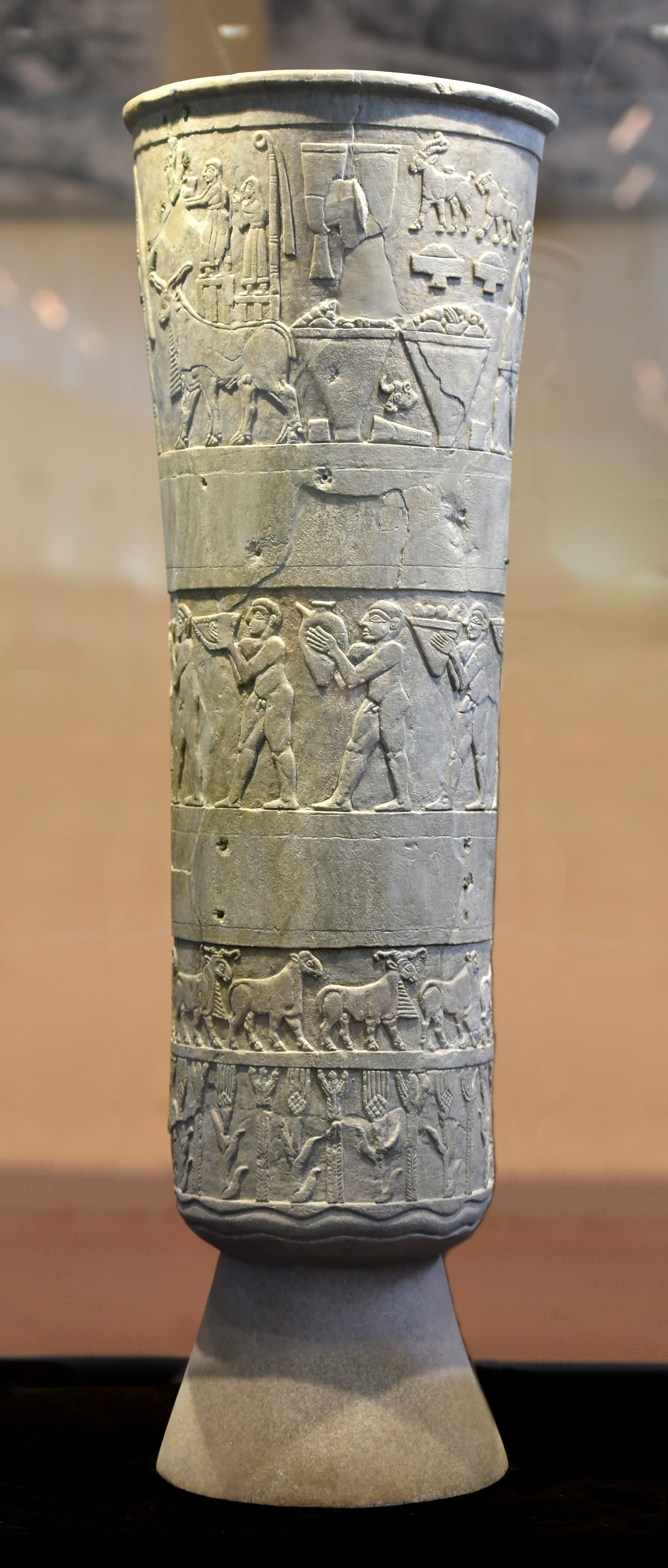
The Uruk Vase (Warka Vase), depicting votive offerings to the goddess Inanna 𒀭𒈹 (3200–3000 BCE)

The history of Sumer spans the late fifth to the third millennium BC in southern Mesopotamia, documenting the world's first transition from Neolithic village life to a complex urban civilization. This development was catalyzed by the "monumentalization of the sacred," a process where modest ritual shrines—most notably at Eridu—evolved into massive temple complexes that functioned as "sacred magnets." These centers exerted a centripetal force on the landscape, triggering an "urban implosion" that concentrated populations into the first true metropolises, such as Uruk.

To manage the resulting "crisis of scale," the Sumerians pioneered fundamental technological and social innovations, including the invention of writing for bureaucratic accounting, the mass production of ceramics for rationing systems, and a centralized administrative hierarchy rooted in the "divine household" (Sumerian: É). While traditionally viewed as a single "cradle of civilization," modern scholarship now recognizes Sumer as a primary participant in a multi-centric Near Eastern network of social complexity that laid the foundations for the first city-states and subsequent empires.

== Neolithic Period ==
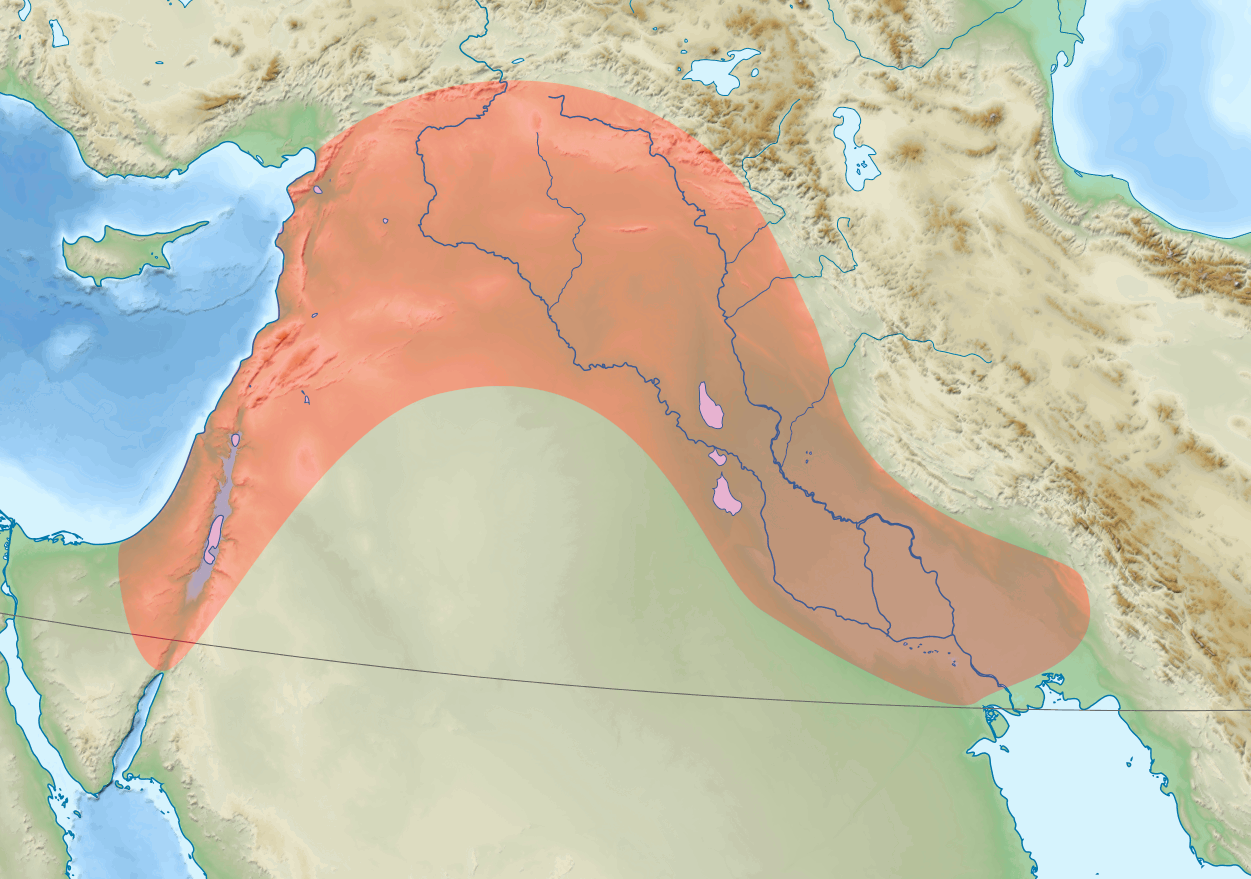
Map of the Fertile Crescent

The transition to urbanism in Mesopotamia was the culmination of the Neolithic Revolution, a transformative process beginning around 10,000 BCE across the broader Fertile Crescent. While the northern "hilly flanks"—encompassing the Zagros and Taurus mountains—saw the earliest domestication of plants and animals, the subsequent colonization of the southern Mesopotamian alluvium by Neolithic farmers marked a critical shift in social complexity.

The "Neolithic Revolution," a term popularized by V. Gordon Childe, describes the fundamental shift from nomadic hunter-gatherer lifestyles to sedentary agricultural communities. This process involved the selective breeding of "founder crops," such as emmer wheat and barley, alongside the domestication of livestock, which facilitated a reliable caloric surplus. This shift was accompanied by a demographic explosion and the development of ground-stone tools, pottery for storage, and permanent mud-brick architecture. Crucially, scholars note that this was not merely a technological change but a "Revolution of Symbols," where new religious and cognitive frameworks were required to manage larger, settled groups. In the Near East, this period established the "household" and "lineage" as the primary units of social organization, which would eventually expand into the bureaucratic structures of the first city-states.

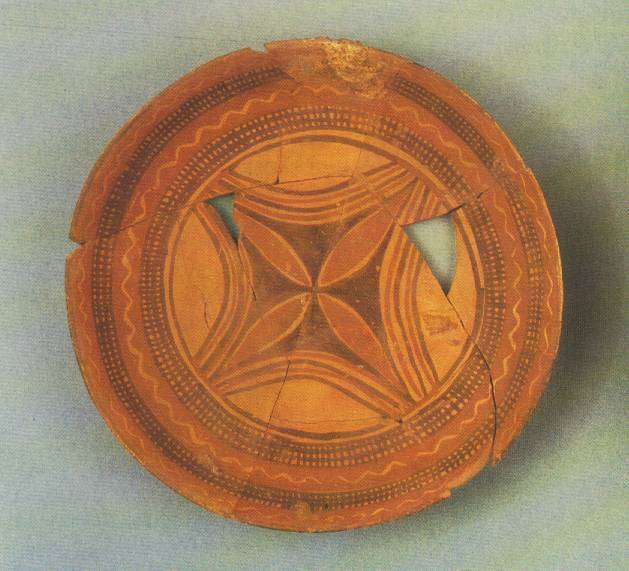
Halaf ware

=== Pre-Ubaid Foundations ===
Before the rise of the first cities, early Neolithic cultures such as the Hassuna, Samarra, and Halaf (c. 7000–5000 BCE) established the sedentary blueprints for Mesopotamian life. The Samarra culture is particularly noted for the first rudimentary experiments in irrigation and the construction of T-shaped communal buildings, which some scholars view as the architectural ancestors of the later Sumerian temples.

=== The Ubaid Period (c. 6500–3800 BCE) ===
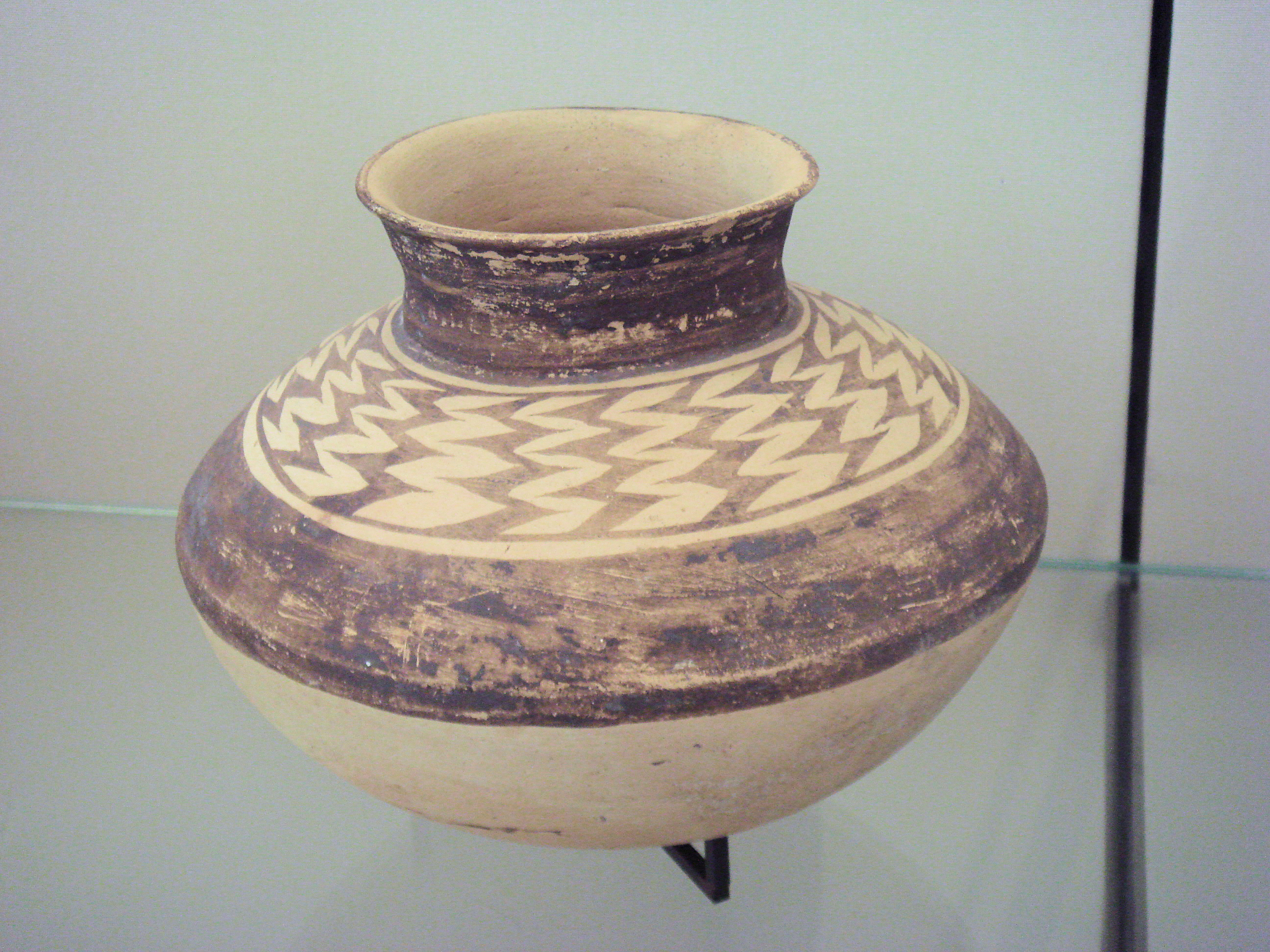
Ubaid 3 pottery, currently in the Louvre Museum (AO 29611)

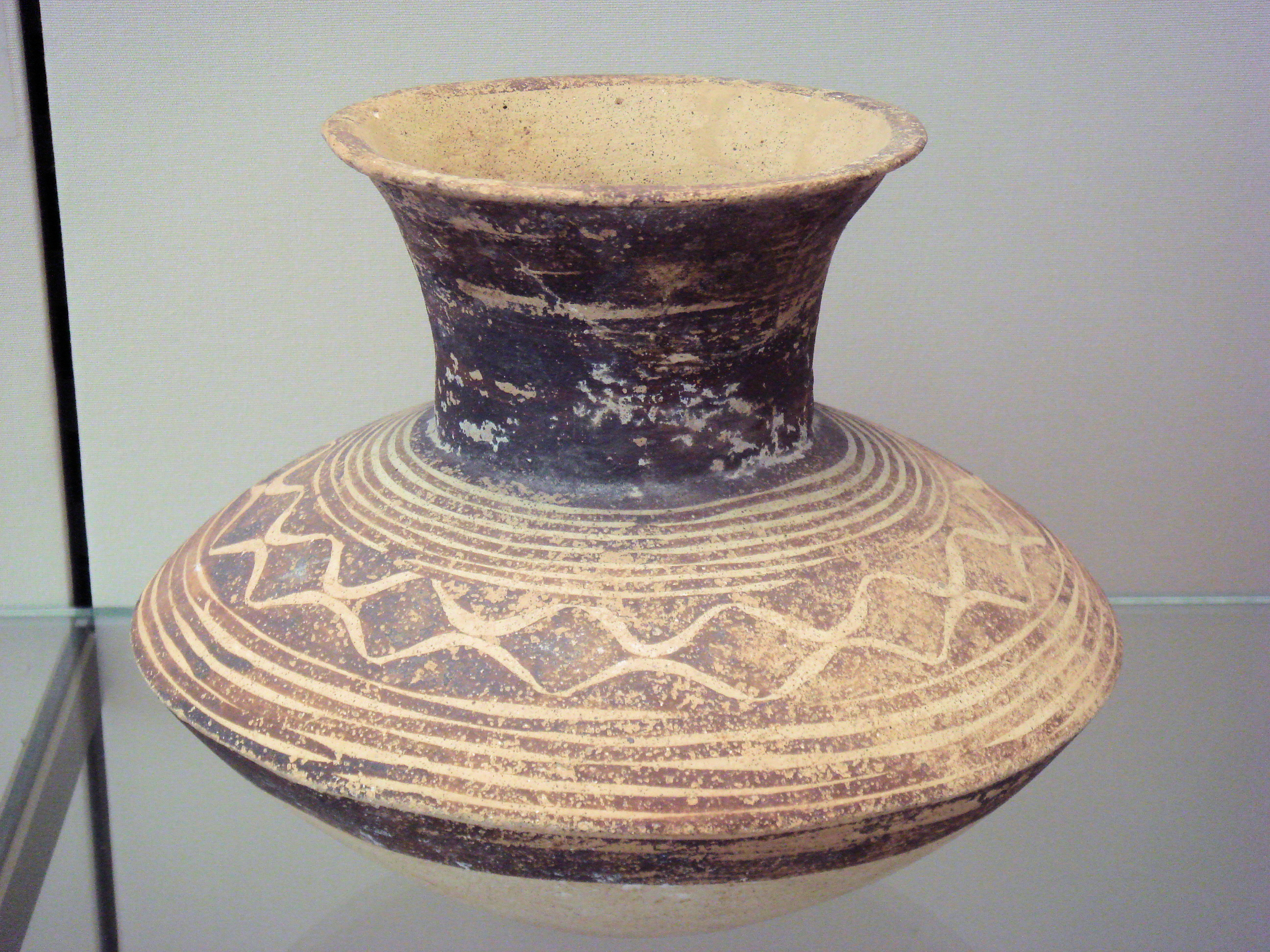
Ubaid 3 pottery, currently in the Louvre Museum (AO 29598)

The Ubaid period represents the definitive link between the Neolithic village and the Bronze Age city. Named after the site of Tell al-'Ubaid, this era saw the expansion of settlement into the marshy south, requiring a high degree of social coordination to manage the volatile river systems. While rooted in Neolithic traditions, the Ubaid period introduced significant technological refinements, most notably the slow wheel (or tournette), which standardized the production of its characteristic monochrome-painted pottery. This era also witnessed the transformative emergence of metallurgy, specifically the transition from cold-hammered native copper to true smelting and casting techniques.

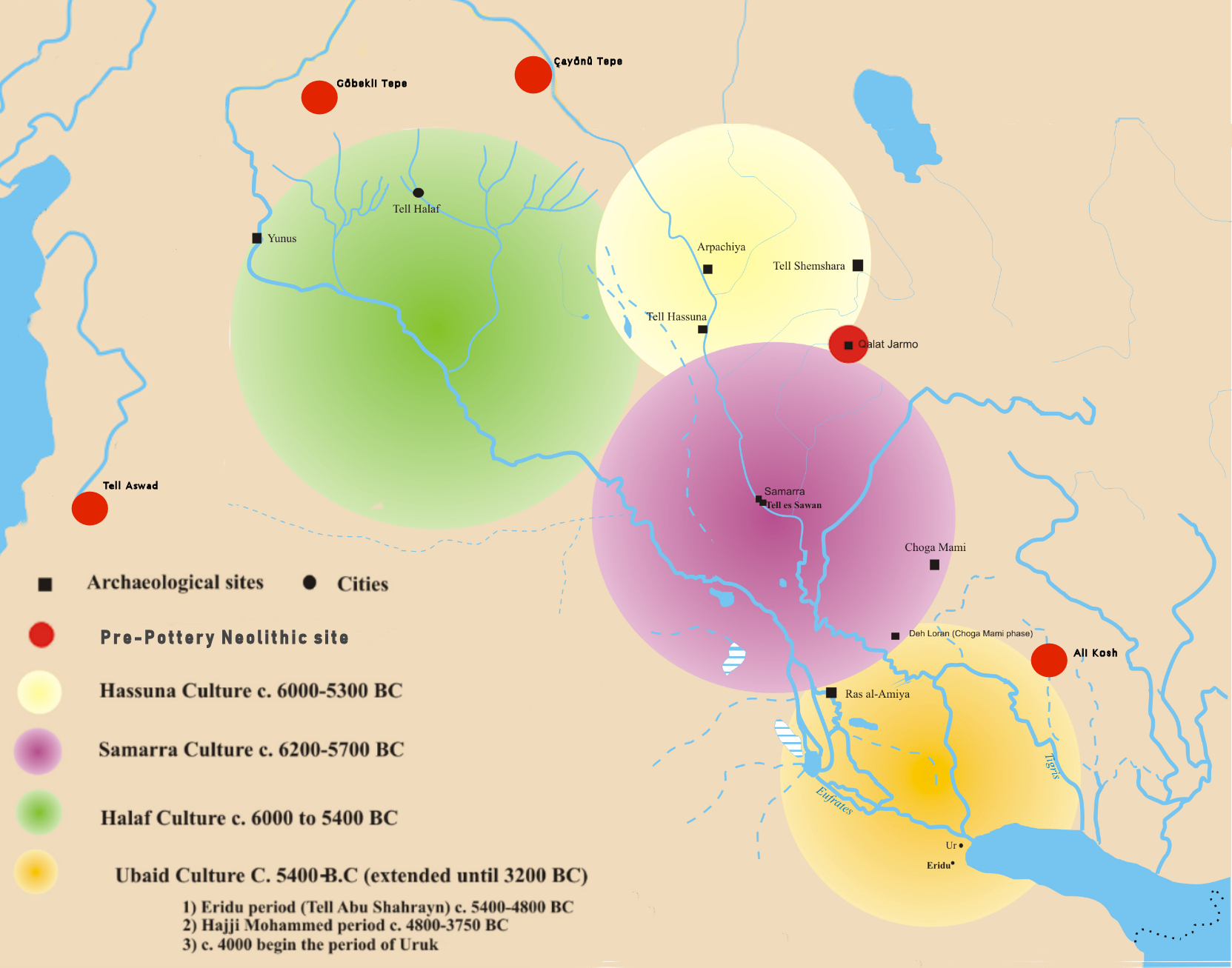
A map of the Near East depicting the approximate extent of the: Pre-Pottery Neolithic Sites Hassuna culture Samarra culture Halaf culture Ubaid culture

Furthermore, the Ubaid established the first systematic long-distance trade networks in the Near East. Despite the lack of local resources in the southern alluvium, Ubaid communities organized the import of obsidian from Anatolia, lapis lazuli from Afghanistan, and copper from the Oman peninsula, utilizing the Persian Gulf as a maritime highway. Unlike later military empires, this Ubaid "influence" spread through shared material culture, which some diffusionist scholars interpret as the first "Sumerian spark" synchronizing disparate Neolithic cultures into a unified trajectory.

The traditional periodization of early Mesopotamian history—strictly dividing the Neolithic, Ubaid, and Uruk periods—is largely a legacy of older excavations and the stratigraphic "type-sites" identified in the early 20th century. Modern archaeological knowledge suggests a much higher degree of continuity and regional overlap, indicating that these "periods" were not sudden breaks but gradual transitions in social complexity. As such, while the Ubaid saw the first significant steps toward centralized ritual spaces, the full "monumentalization of the sacred"—the emergence of the temple as the urban anchor—will be treated in detail in the following section on the Village to City Transition.

== Village to city transition ==
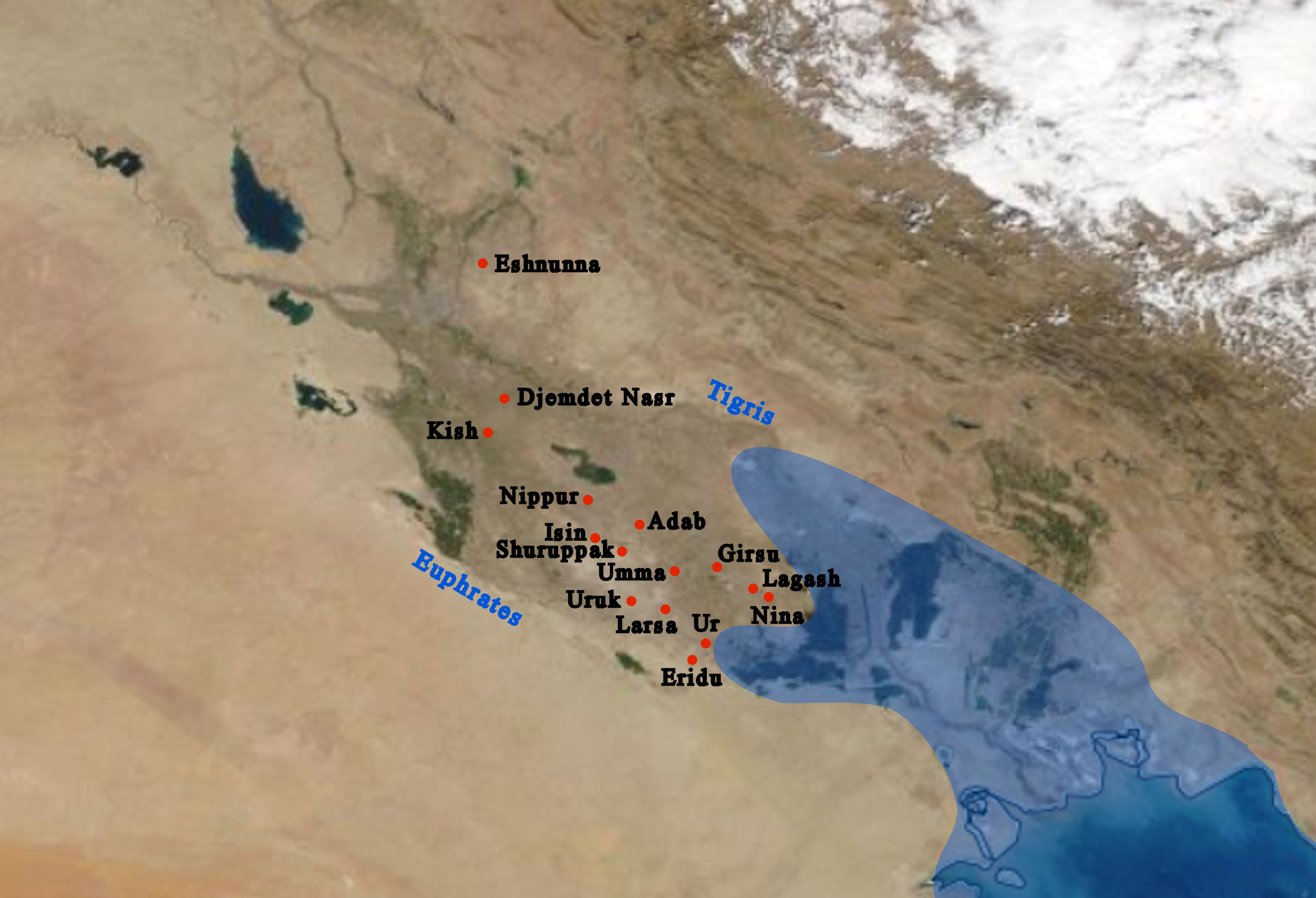
Map of early Sumerian cities, with approximate 4th millennium shoreline

Until the mid-fifth millennium BC, Southern Mesopotamia was dotted with small Neolithic villages similar to those in the rest of the Fertile Crescent. Then, in the last centuries of the fifth millennium, one of these villages, known to us as Eridu, started to turn into what we now call a city. The transformation of Eridu is most visible in the stratigraphic sequence of its central shrine, the Temple of Enki. Over a period of nearly a thousand years, a modest, one-room cultic structure (Temple XVII) evolved through eighteen successive levels into a massive, multi-tiered monumental platform. This process of "monumentalization" served as the primary engine for urban growth; as the temple expanded, it required an increasingly specialized workforce, including architects, bricklayers, and artisans, who settled permanently around the sacred precinct. By the late Ubaid period, Eridu had transcended the village model, functioning as a "sacred magnet" that drew pilgrims and resources from across the marshlands, creating the first documented instance of a centralized administrative hierarchy rooted in ritual prestige.

=== Uruk and Nippur ===
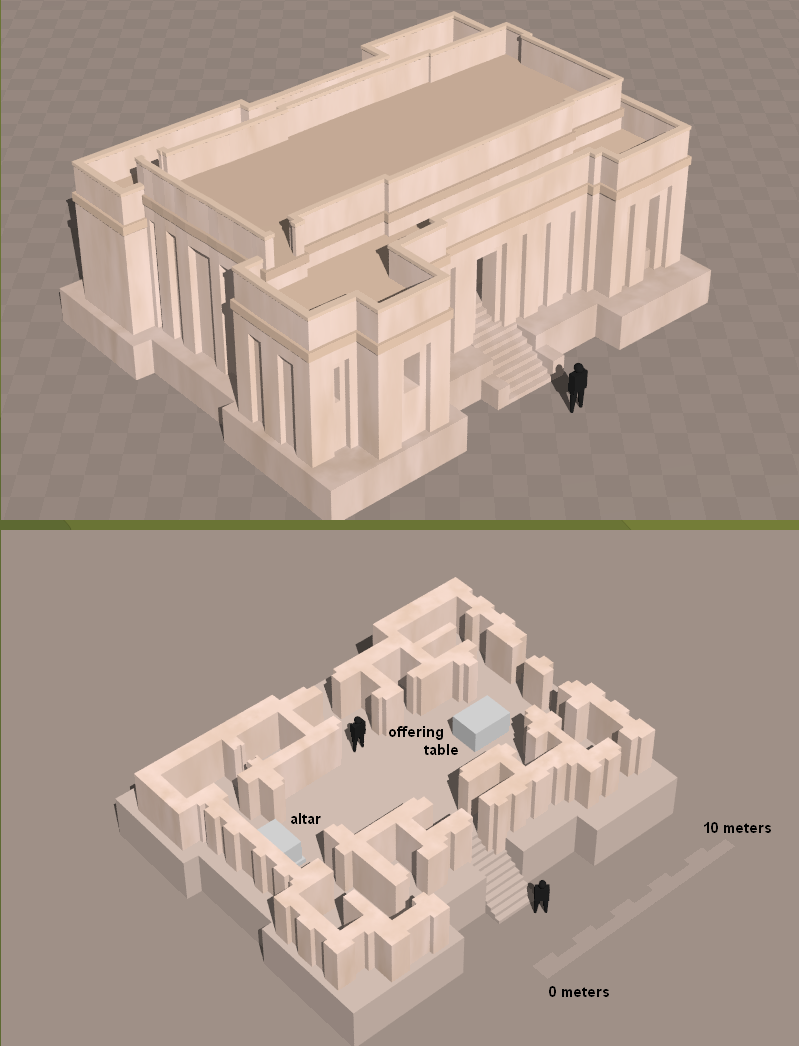
Large buildings, implying centralized government, started to be made. Eridu Temple, final Ubaid period (LC-1)

A similar but more expansive trajectory occurred at Uruk (modern Warka) during the fourth millennium BC. While Eridu provided the spiritual prototype, Uruk represented the first true metropolization of the landscape. The transition here was marked by a sudden and dramatic increase in settlement size, fueled by what archaeologists describe as "urban implosion," where surrounding rural populations were drawn into the city's two main precincts: the Eanna District and the Anu District. The monumentalization at Uruk was even more radical than at Eridu, featuring the construction of the "Stone Cone Mosaic Temple" and the "White Temple" built upon a proto-ziggurat. These structures were not merely places of worship but served as the focal points for a revolutionary administrative system. This period saw the introduction of mass-produced ceramics—specifically beveled-rim bowls—used to distribute rations to a labor force that was no longer engaged in direct food production, signaling the final break from the Neolithic village economy.

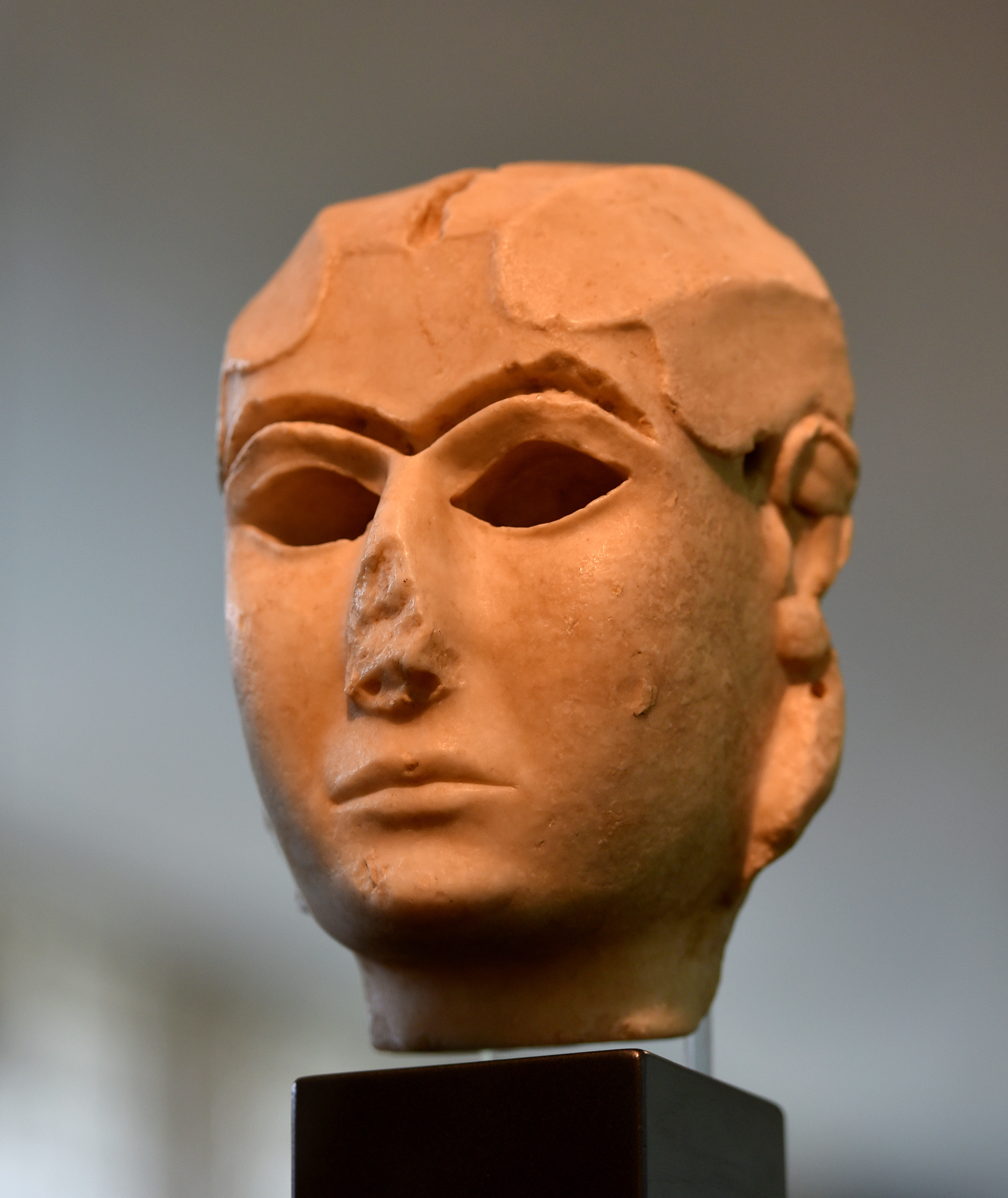
Mask of Warka (Uruk) National Museum of Iraq

Nippur, located further north, followed a distinct path toward urbanization that emphasized its role as a neutral, pan-Sumerian religious center. Unlike Uruk, which grew into a political and military powerhouse, Nippur’s transition from village to city was dictated by its cosmological status as the "mooring post" of heaven and earth. Excavations in the Temple of Inanna and the Ekur (the "Mountain House") of Enlil demonstrate that Nippur functioned as a sacred destination for multiple competing city-states. Its urbanization was characterized by a "heterarchical" structure, where the city grew not through imperial conquest, but as a clearing-house for inter-city diplomacy and ritual legitimation. This religious gravity ensured that Nippur remained a stable urban center even as political power shifted between other southern cities, proving that the ideological "superstructure" of the temple could sustain urban life independently of localized military or economic dominance.

=== Other cities emerging in the fourth millennium BC ===
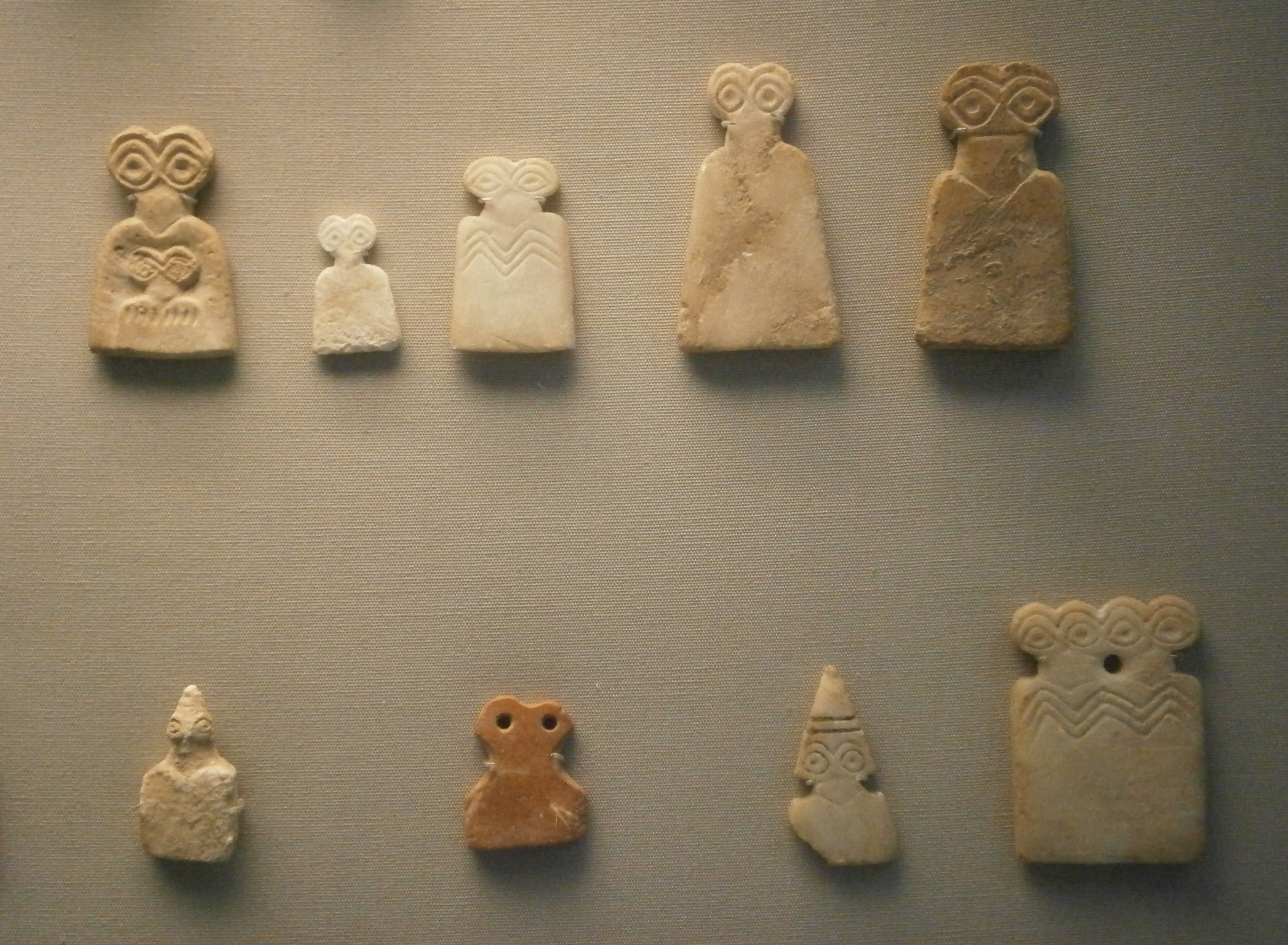
Tell Brak Eye idols

The expansion of the Uruk model catalyzed the emergence of several other urban centers across the Near East, often following the "sacred magnet" or trading post models. Cities such as Girsu (Tello) and Lagash developed as administrative hubs mirroring the temple-centered growth of the south. In the central region, Kish emerged as a significant power at the narrowest point between the Tigris and Euphrates.

Southern influence reached as far as Susa, which adopted Uruk-style administrative tools like cylinder seals and clay bullae. To the north, sites like Habuba Kabira and Jebel Aruda were established as planned "colonies" featuring sophisticated urban grids. These centers prove that by the end of the fourth millennium, the village-to-city transition was a shared network of ritual ideology and long-distance exchange. Furthermore, northern sites like Tell Brak (ancient Nagar) demonstrate that urbanization occurred through the monumentalization of the "Eye Temple", showing that the "temple magnet" concept was a pan-Mesopotamian phenomenon.

=== Chronology ===
In recent decades, the field has transitioned from the traditional pottery-based "Ubaid/Uruk" periodization to the "Late Chalcolithic (LC)" system. While the older system relied heavily on excavations at Warka to define "Early, Middle, and Late Uruk," it often failed to account for regional variations in the north and east. The new LC-1 to LC-5 system, formalized at a Santa Fe workshop in 2001, provides a more granular absolute chronology based on radiocarbon dating and synchronized stratigraphic sequences across Greater Mesopotamia. This framework allows scholars to track the "village-to-city" transition not as a single event, but as a staggered process beginning in the LC-1 (post-Ubaid) and reaching its peak "metropolitan" phase in LC-5.

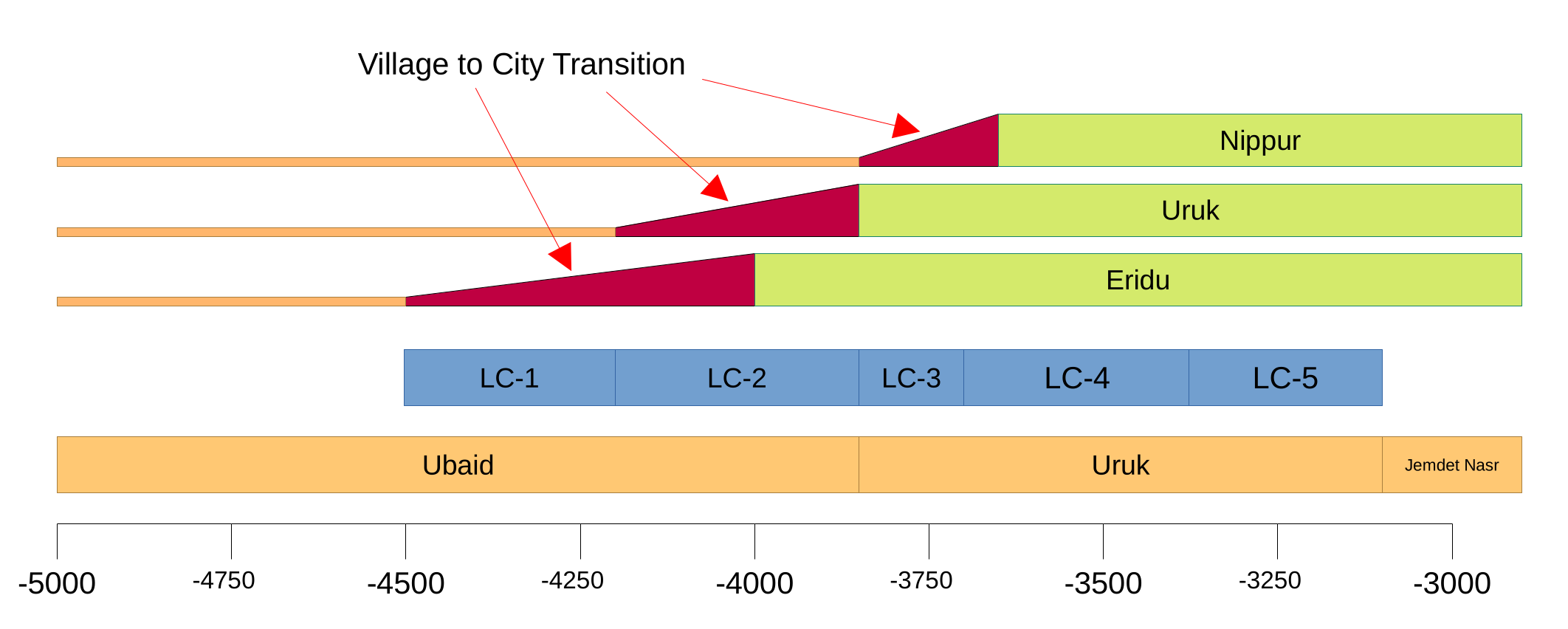
Chronology of Late Chalcolithic Sumer (LC-1 to 5), with the older periodization scheme (Ubaid/Uruk) indicated below. The village-to-city transition is indicated for Eridu, Uruk and Nippur (see table below)

Major Urban Centers of the 4th Millennium BC (Sorted by Primary Transition)
| City | Region | Transition Period | Approx. Dates (BC) | Main Specificities |
|---|---|---|---|---|
| Eridu | South (Alluvium) | Terminal Ubaid / LC-1 | 4500–4000 | Oldest cult center; successive monumentalization of the Temple of Enki. |
| Uruk | South (Alluvium) | LC-2 to LC-3 | 4200–3800 | Rapid metropolization; emergence of writing and mass-produced rations. |
| Nippur | Central (Alluvium) | LC-3 | 3800–3600 | Pan-Sumerian religious center; mediator between competing city-states. |
| Tell Hamoukar | North (Jazira) | LC-3 | 3800–3600 | Strategic trade hub; early fortifications and evidence of organized warfare. |
| Tell Brak (Nagar) | North (Khabur) | LC-3 | 3800–3600 | Independent northern urbanization; massive "Eye Temple"; early specialized labor. |
| Susa | East (Elam/Khuzestan) | LC-3 | 3800–3600 | Bridge between Mesopotamia and Iranian plateau; early complex accounting. |
| Girsu (Tello) | South (Alluvium) | LC-3 | 3700–3400 | Agricultural and ritual hub of the Lagash territory; center of Ningirsu cult. |
| Kish | Central (Alluvium) | LC-4 | 3600–3300 | Strategic "neck" of the rivers; early Semitic-Sumerian cultural synthesis. |
| Nineveh | North (Tigris) | LC-4 | 3600–3300 | Key Tigris crossing; early monumental focus on the Kuyunjik mound. |
| Godin Tepe | East (Zagros) | LC-4 | 3500–3300 | Merchant enclave; specialized in lapis lazuli and metal trade routes. |
| Ur | South (Alluvium) | LC-4 | 3500–3200 | Maritime port; dominant in Persian Gulf trade and pastoral economies. |
| Chogha Mish | East (Susiana) | LC-4 | 3500–3200 | Regional administrative center; early use of clay tokens and bullae. |
| Lagash (Al-Hiba) | South (Alluvium) | LC-4 | 3400–3200 | Massive urban footprint (400+ hectares); major riverine transport node. |
| Umma | South (Alluvium) | LC-4 to LC-5 | 3400–3100 | Important agricultural center; frequent rival to the Lagash city-state. |
| Larsa | South (Alluvium) | LC-4 to LC-5 | 3400–3100 | Center of the sun-god Utu; early development of monumental solar temples. |
| Adab | Central (Alluvium) | LC-5 | 3300–3000 | High-density urban hub on the Iturungal canal; major early administrative center. |
| Arslantepe | North (Anatolia) | LC-5 | 3300–3000 | Highland administrative complex; earliest known "temple-palace" transition. |
| Habuba Kabira | North (Euphrates) | LC-5 | 3300–3100 | Planned colonial outpost; defensive walls and southern-style urban grid. |
| Jebel Aruda | North (Euphrates) | LC-5 | 3300–3100 | Elevated Uruk-style ritual center overlooking the Euphrates trade corridor. |

=== The Monumentalization of the Sacred and the "Temple-Magnet" ===
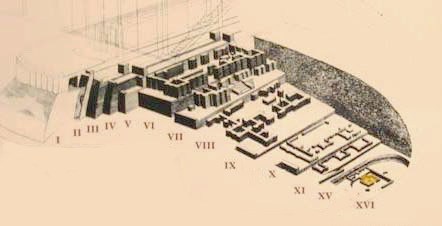
"Temple Sequence" building layers in Eridu. LC-1, 2 (4500-4000 BC)

The transition from Neolithic village life to the first urban centers is increasingly defined by the "monumentalization of the sacred," a process where ritual architecture served as the primary catalyst for social and economic complexity. In this historiographical model, the temple functioned as a "sacred magnet," exerting a centripetal force that drew dispersed populations into a centralized urban core. At sites like Eridu, the stratigraphic sequence demonstrates that the growth of the temple preceded the growth of the city; the sanctuary was not a byproduct of urban surplus, but the very engine that created it.

This "monumentalization" involved the physical elevation of the shrine upon increasingly large platforms, visually and symbolically separating the sacred from the profane. This architectural evolution necessitated the first large-scale mobilization of labor, leading to the emergence of specialized classes of builders, artisans, and administrators who were supported by the temple's ritual prestige rather than kinship ties. The temple thus transitioned from a community meeting house to a "divine household" (Sumerian: É), which managed land, labor, and irrigation as a consequence of its religious centrality.

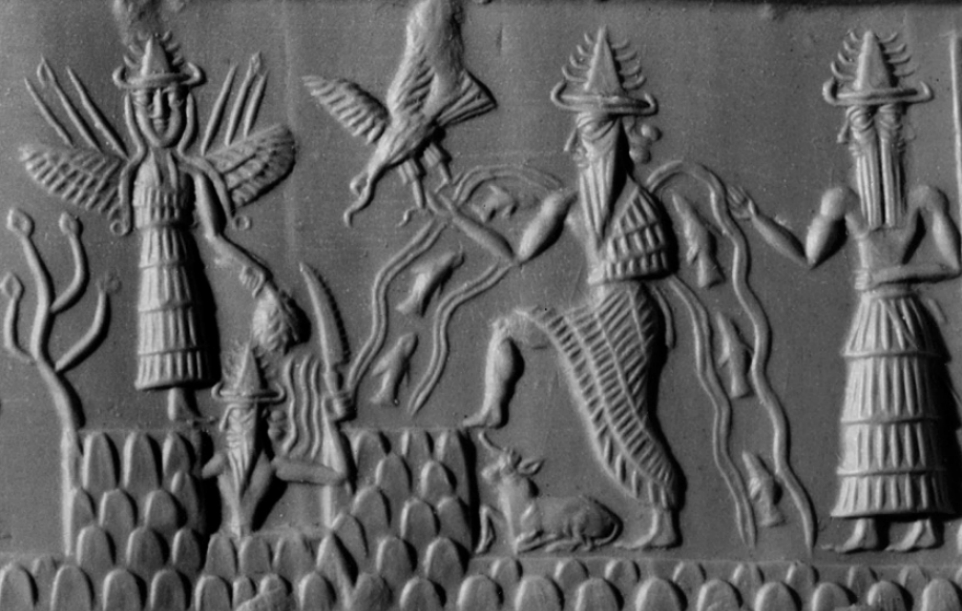
Detail of the Adda Seal, an ancient Akkadian cylinder seal (circa 2300 BCE) depicting Enki with water flowing out of his shoulders.

At Uruk, the "Temple-Magnet" reached its metropolitan zenith during the Late Chalcolithic period. The construction of the Eanna District, with its massive limestone temples and mosaic-decorated courtyards, acted as an ideological beacon that facilitated "urban implosion"—the rapid migration of rural populations into the city walls. Scholars argue that the technical innovations of the 4th millennium BC, such as the invention of writing and mass-produced ceramics (notably beveled-rim bowls), were specifically developed to manage the crowds and offerings attracted by these monumental sacred projects. The following table lists the primary temple complexes of the major Sumerian cities by their historical appearance:

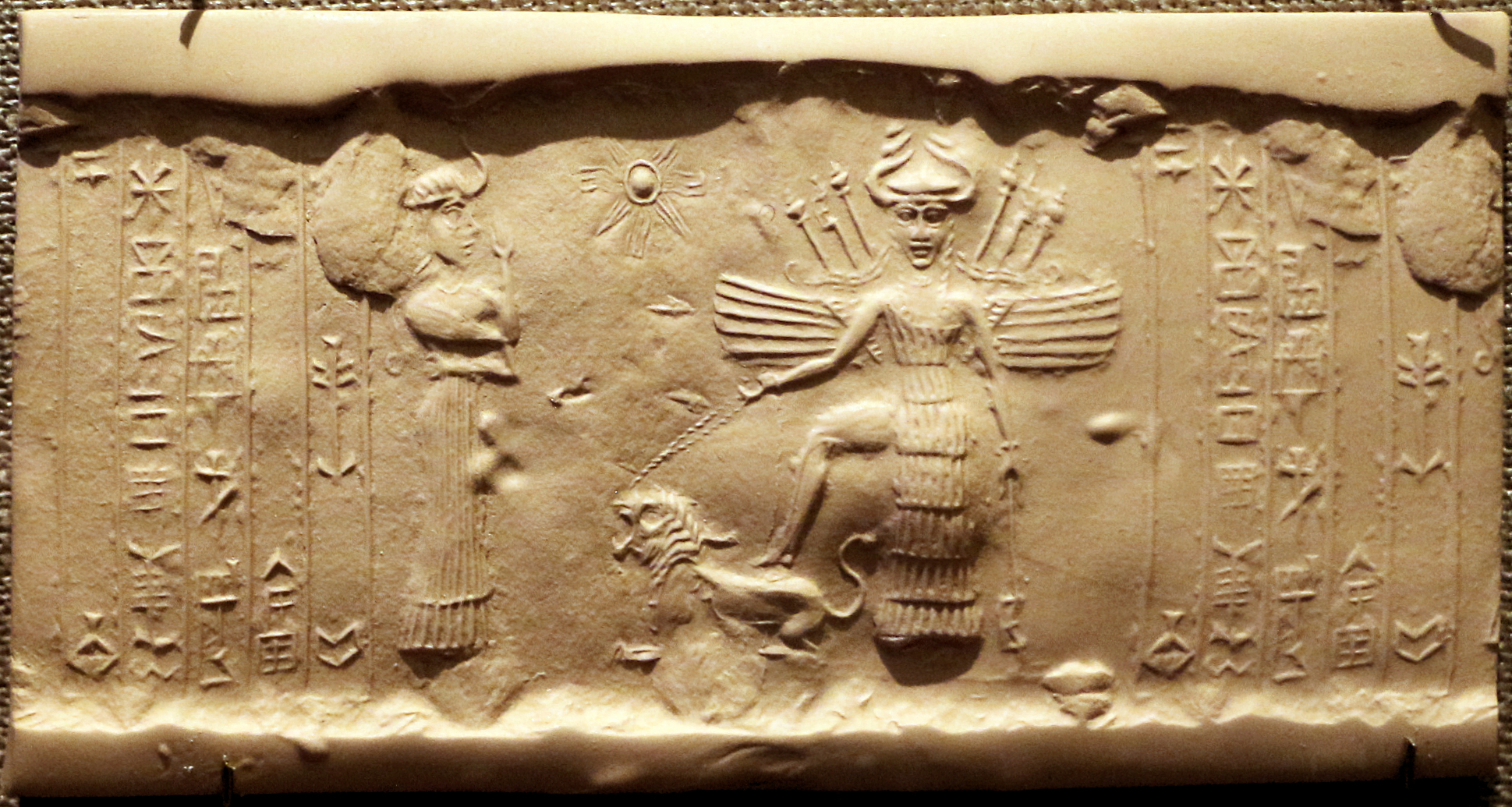
Ancient Akkadian cylinder seal depicting Inanna resting her foot on the back of a lion while Ninshubur stands in front of her paying obeisance, c. 2334–2154 BCE

| City | Temple Complex | Deities |
|---|---|---|
| Eridu | E-Abzu | Enki |
| Uruk | E-anna | Inanna and An |
| Nippur | E-kur | Enlil |
| Ur | E-kishnugal | Nanna |
| Larsa | E-babbar | Utu |
| Bad-tibira | E-mush | Dumuzi and Inanna |
| Girsu | E-ninnu | Ningirsu |
| Umma | E-mah | Shara |
| Shuruppak | E-dimgalanna | Sud (Ninlil) |
| Marad | E-igikalamma | Lugal-Marada |
| Kish | Hursagkalamma | Ninhursag |
| Sippar | E-babbar | Utu |
| Kutha | E-meslam | Nergal |

=== Development of writing and urban administration ===
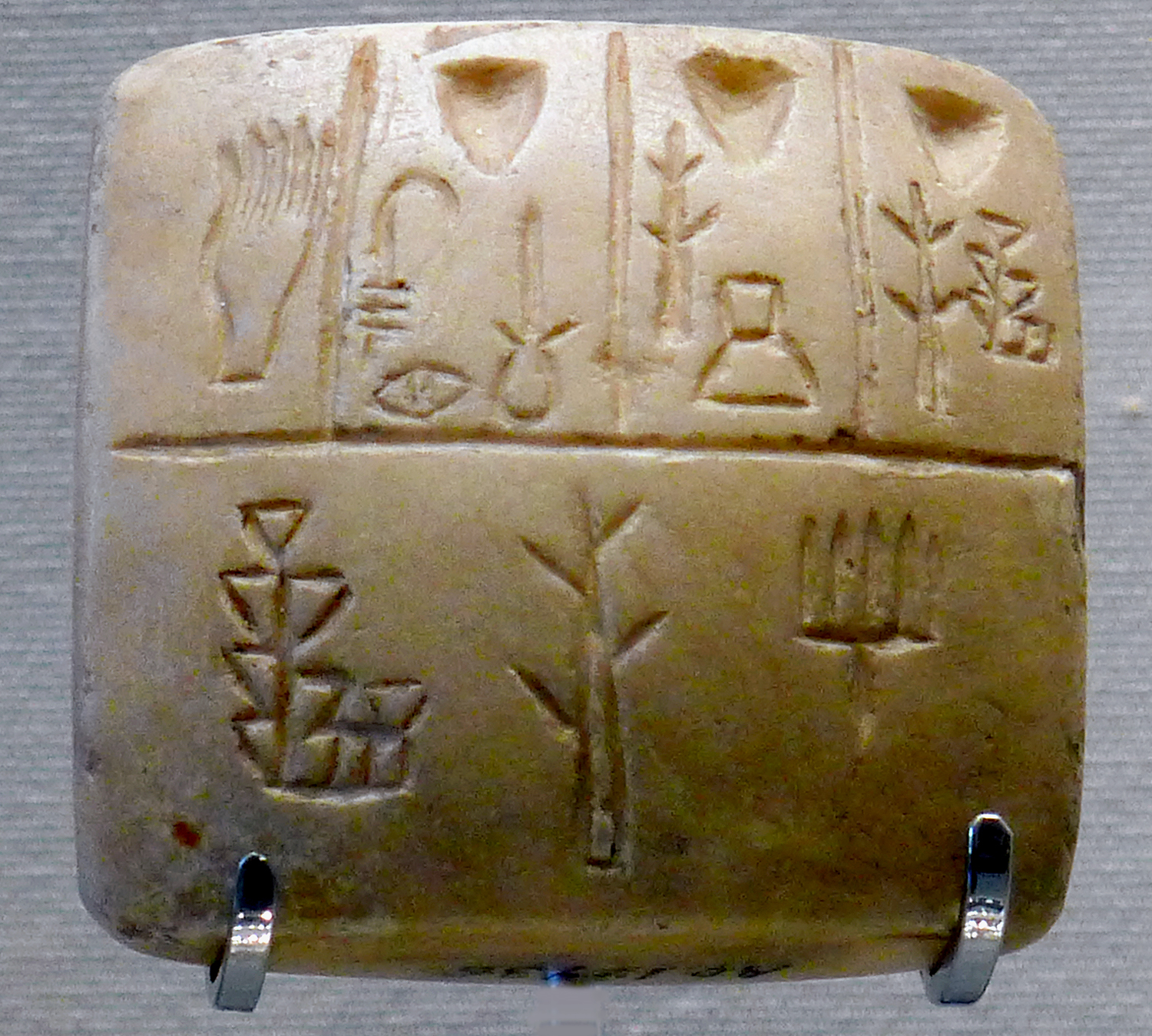
Tablet with proto-cuneiform pictographs Uruk LC-5 (late 4th millennium BC)

The transition from village to city was inextricably linked to the invention of writing, which emerged not for literature, but as a logistical necessity for the "Temple-Magnet" economy. By the late Uruk period (c. 3300 BC), the sheer volume of offerings, labor records, and resource distribution managed by the Eanna precinct surpassed the capacity of human memory. Writing developed as a technological solution to the "crisis of scale" inherent in the first metropolis.

The process began with the use of clay tokens, which represented specific quantities of goods like barley or sheep. These were eventually enclosed in hollow clay spheres called bullae, marked on the outside with seals to guarantee their contents. By Uruk IV, administrators began pressing tokens directly into flat clay tablets, leading to the creation of proto-cuneiform logograms. This allowed the temple bureaucracy to track complex tribute systems and ration distributions to a non-food-producing workforce, effectively serving as the "operating system" for the first urban civilizations.

| Stage | Period | Medium | Administrative Function |
|---|---|---|---|
| Clay Tokens | Neolithic | Individual clay shapes | Simple accounting of village assets. |
| Bullae | Early Uruk period (LC-2) | Sealed clay envelopes | Verification of long-distance trade transactions. |
| Numerical Tablets | Middle Uruk (LC-3, 4) | Pressed clay slabs | Quantitative recording of agricultural surplus. |
| Proto-cuneiform | Late Uruk (LC-4, 5) | Pictographic clay tablets | Inventories of the Eanna and Anu precincts. |
| Cuneiform | Early Dynastic | Wedge-shaped stylus marks | Sophisticated state records, legal codes, and literature. |

== Jemdet Nasr Period ==
The Jemdet Nasr period (3100 to 2900 BC) is characterized by the transition from a "globalized" Uruk system to a more regionalized network of Sumerian city-states. Architecturally, it is defined by the continued use of the small, rectangular Riemchen brick, though on a less monumental scale than the Late Uruk "cathedrals." The most distinctive archaeological marker is the appearance of polychrome pottery (also called "Scarlet Ware"), featuring geometric and naturalistic designs painted in black and plum-red pigments. Administratively, the period saw the advancement of proto-cuneiform into a more abstract, linear script capable of more complex bookkeeping, alongside the use of "City Seals" that linked multiple urban centers in shared economic or religious obligations. These developments bridged the gap between the temple-led proto-literate society and the heroic, militarized kingships of the Early Dynastic era.

Despite these features, the validity of the Jemdet Nasr period as a distinct chronological unit remains a subject of significant debate among archaeologists and historians of the Ancient Near East. Many scholars, notably Hans Nissen, argue that the period is better understood as a sub-phase of the preceding Uruk period, often designated in technical literature as "Uruk III". Critics of the Jemdet Nasr designation point to the lack of a clear stratigraphic break at major sites like Uruk, suggesting that the administrative and cultural changes were evolutionary rather than revolutionary, representing a continuous tradition of the "Late Uruk" culture. Furthermore, some view the period not as a temporal era but as a "pottery horizon" defined by the localized popularity of specific luxury ceramics that co-existed with Uruk-style wares.

== Early Dynastic period ==
The Early Dynastic Period began after a cultural break with the preceding Jemdet Nasr period that has been radio-carbon dated to about 2900 BC at the beginning of the Early Dynastic I Period. No inscriptions have yet been found verifying any names of kings that can be associated with the Early Dynastic I period. The ED I period is distinguished from the ED II period by the narrow cylinder seals of the ED I period and the broader wider ED II seals engraved with banquet scenes or animal-contest scenes. The Early Dynastic II period is when Gilgamesh, the famous king of Uruk, is believed to have reigned. Texts from the ED II period are not yet understood. Later inscriptions have been found bearing some Early Dynastic II names from the Sumerian King List. The Early Dynastic IIIa period, also known as the Fara period, is when syllabic writing began. Accounting records and an undeciphered logographic script existed before the Fara Period, but the full flow of human speech was first recorded about 2600 BC at the beginning of the Fara Period. The Early Dynastic IIIb period is also known as the Pre-Sargonic period.

Hegemony, which came to be conferred by the Nippur priesthood, alternated among a number of competing dynasties, hailing from Sumerian city-states traditionally including Kish, Uruk, Ur, Adab and Akshak, as well as some from outside of southern Mesopotamia, such as Awan, Hamazi, and Mari, until the Akkadians, under Sargon of Akkad, overtook the area.

=== First Dynasty of Kish ===
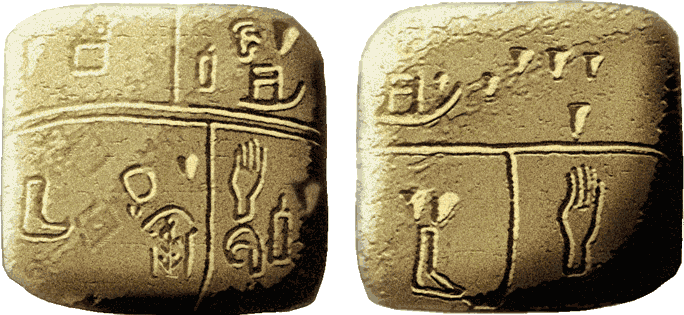
The Kish tablet, a limestone tablet from Kish with pictographic, early cuneiform, writing (ca. 3350–3200 BC). Possibly the earliest known example of writing. Ashmolean Museum.

The earliest Dynastic name on the list known from other legendary sources is Etana, whom it calls "the shepherd, who ascended to heaven and consolidated all the foreign countries". He was estimated by Roux to have lived approximately 3000 BC. Among the 11 kings who followed, a number of Semitic Akkadian names are recorded, suggesting that these people made up a sizable proportion of the population of this northern city. The earliest monarch on the list whose historical existence has been independently attested through archaeological inscription is En-me-barage-si of Kish (c. 2600 BC), said to have defeated Elam and built the temple of Enlil in Nippur. Enmebaragesi's successor, Aga, is said to have fought with Gilgamesh of Uruk, the fifth king of that city. From this time, for a period Uruk seems to have had some kind of hegemony in Sumer. This illustrates a weakness of the Sumerian king list, as contemporaries are often placed in successive dynasties, making reconstruction difficult.

=== First Dynasty of Uruk ===
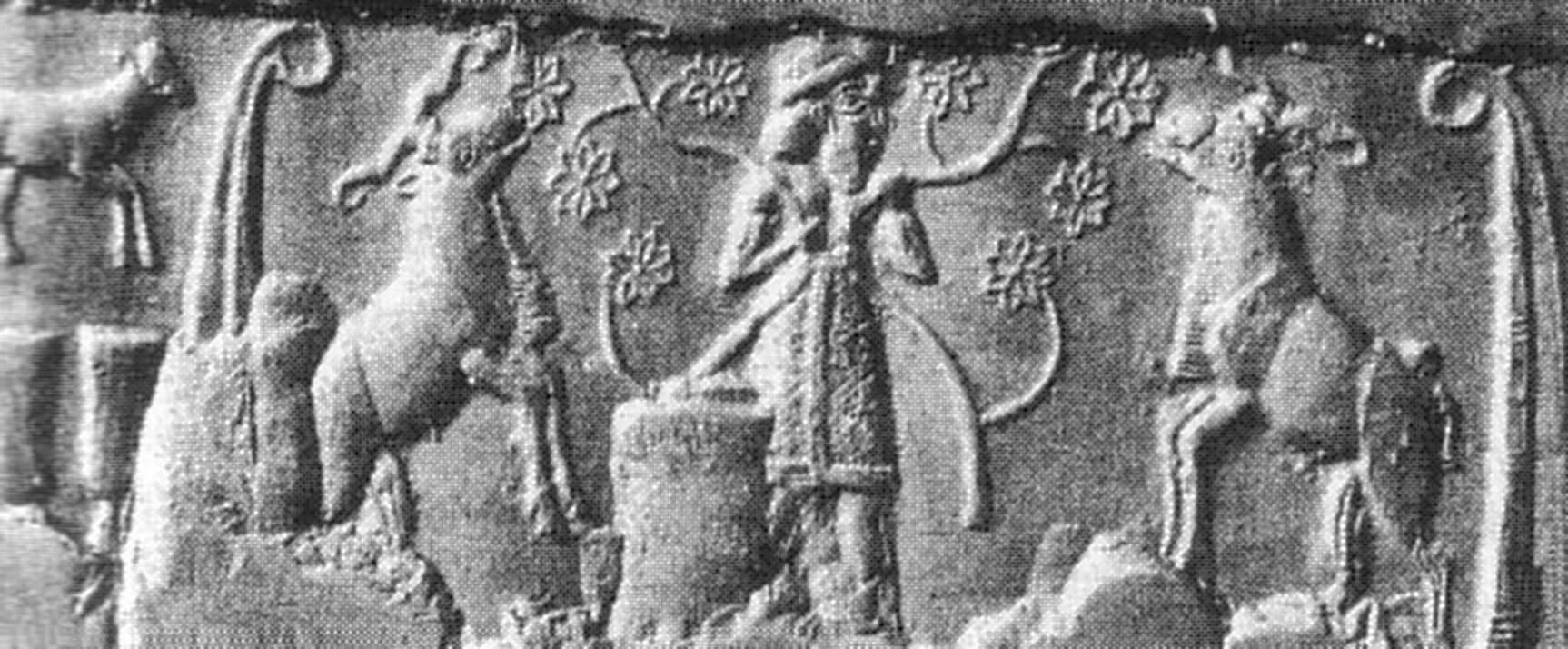
Cylinder seal impression from Uruk, showing a "king-priest" in brimmed hat and long coat feeding the herd of goddess Inanna, symbolized by two rams, framed by reed bundles as on the Uruk Vase. Late Uruk period, 3300–3000 BC. Pergamon Museum/ Vorderasiatisches Museum.

Mesh-ki-ang-gasher is listed as the first King of Uruk. He was followed by Enmerkar. The epic Enmerkar and the Lord of Aratta tells of his voyage by river to Aratta, a mountainous, mineral-rich country up-river from Sumer. He was followed by Lugalbanda, also known from fragmentary legends, and then by Dumuzid, the Fisherman. The most famous monarch of this dynasty was Dumuzid's successor Gilgamesh, hero of the Epic of Gilgamesh, where he is called Lugalbanda's son. Ancient, fragmentary copies of this text have been discovered in locations as far apart as Hattusas in Anatolia, Megiddo in Israel, and Tell el Amarna in Egypt.

=== First Dynasty of Ur ===
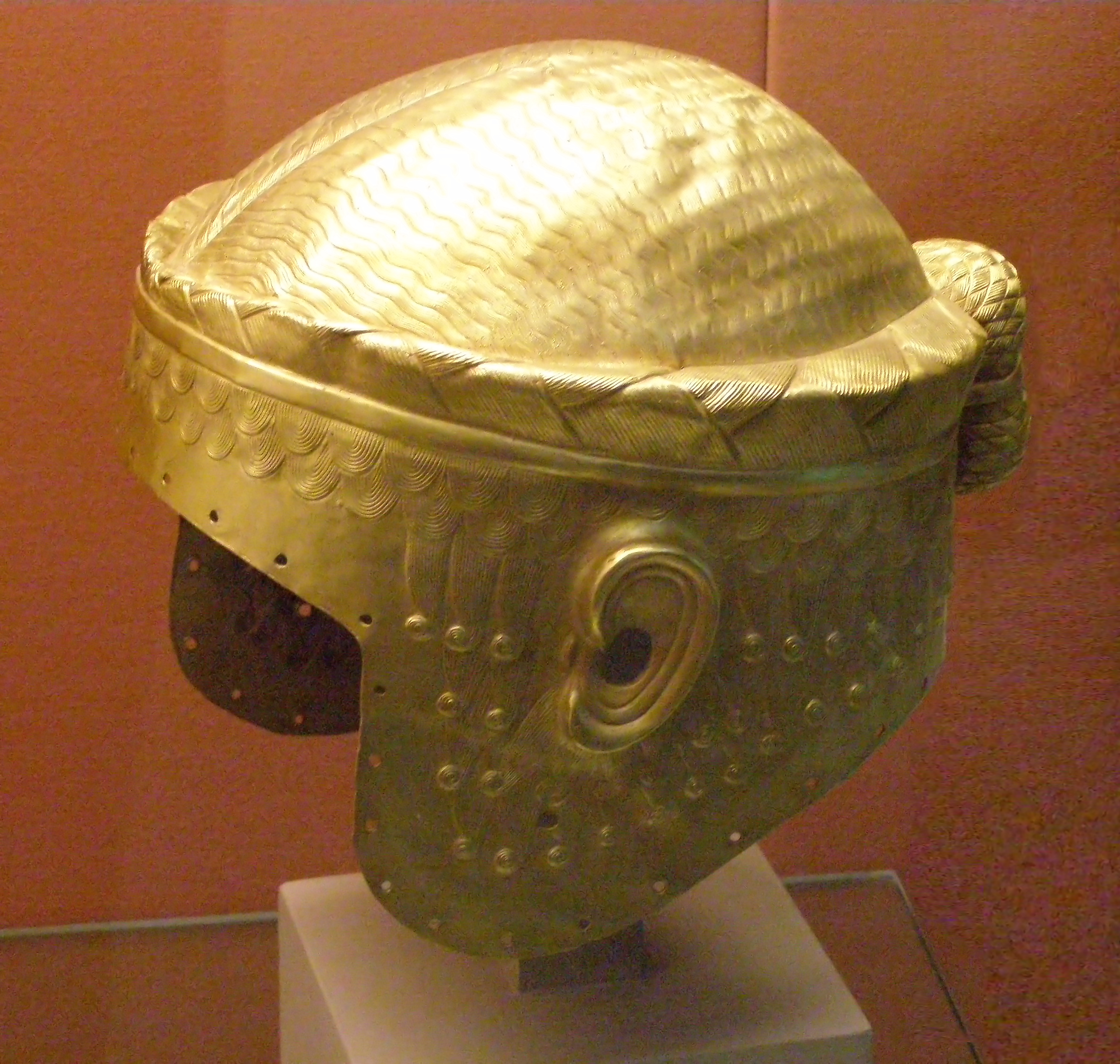
Gold helmet of Meskalamdug, ruler of the First Dynasty of Ur, 26th century BCE.

This dynasty is dated to the 26th century BC. Meskalamdug is the first archaeologically recorded king (Lugal from lu=man, gal=big) of the city of Ur. He was succeeded by his son Akalamdug, and Akalamdug by his son Mesh-Ane-pada. Mesh-Ane-pada is the first king of Ur listed on the king list, and it says he defeated Lugalkildu of Uruk. He also seems to have subjected Kish, thereafter assuming the title "King of Kish" for himself. This title would be used by many kings of the preeminent dynasties for some time afterward. King Mesilim of Kish is known from inscriptions from Lagash and Adab stating that he built temples in those cities, where he seems to have held some influence. He is also mentioned in some of the earliest monuments from Lagash as arbitrating a border dispute between Lugal-sha-engur, ensi (high priest or governor) of Lagash, and the ensi of their main rival, the neighbouring town of Umma. Mesilim's placement before, during, or after the reign of Mesannepada in Ur is uncertain, owing to the lack of other synchronous names in the inscriptions, and his absence from the king list.

=== Dynasty of Awan ===
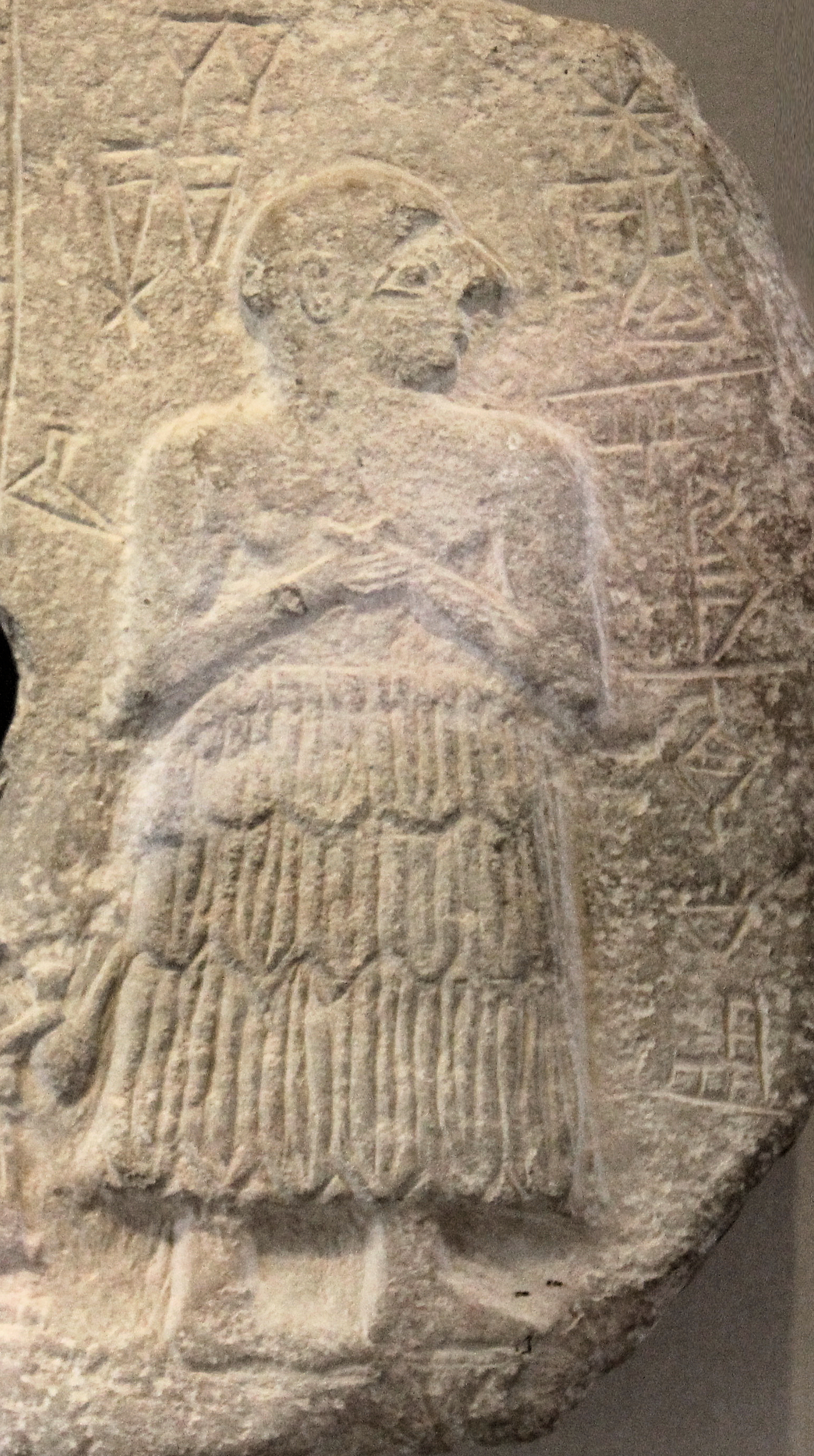
A Sumerian relief of Ur-Nanshe, king of Lagash circa 2500 BCE.

This dynasty is dated to the 26th century BC, about the same time as Elam is also mentioned clearly. According to the Sumerian king list, Elam, Sumer's neighbor to the east, held the kingship in Sumer for a brief period, based in the city of Awan.

=== Second Dynasty of Uruk ===
Enshakushanna was a king of Uruk in the later 3rd millennium BC who is named on the Sumerian king list, which states his reign to have been 60 years. He was succeeded in Uruk by Lugal-kinishe-dudu, but the hegemony seems to have passed briefly to Eannatum of Lagash.

=== Empire of Lugal-Ane-mundu of Adab ===
Following this period, the region of Mesopotamia seems to have come under the sway of a Sumerian conqueror from Adab, Lugal-Ane-mundu, ruling over Uruk, Ur, and Lagash. According to inscriptions, he ruled from the Persian Gulf to the Mediterranean, and up to the Zagros Mountains, including Elam. However, his empire fell apart with his death; the king-list indicates that Mari in Upper Mesopotamia was the next city to hold the hegemony.

=== Kug-Bau and the Third Dynasty of Kish ===
The Third Dynasty of Kish, represented solely by Kug-Bau or Kubaba, is unique in the fact that she was the only woman named on the king-list to reign as "king". It adds that she had been a tavern keeper before overthrowing the hegemony of Mari and becoming monarch. In later centuries she was worshipped as a minor goddess, particularly at Carchemish, achieving some status in the Hurrian and Hittites periods. In the post-Hittite Phrygian period she was called Kubele (Latin Cybele), Great Mother of the Gods.

=== Dynasty of Akshak ===
Akshak too achieved independence with a line of rulers extending from Puzur-Nirah, Ishu-Il, and Shu-Suen, son of Ishu-Il, before being defeated by the rulers in the Fourth Dynasty of Kish.

=== First Dynasty of Lagash ===
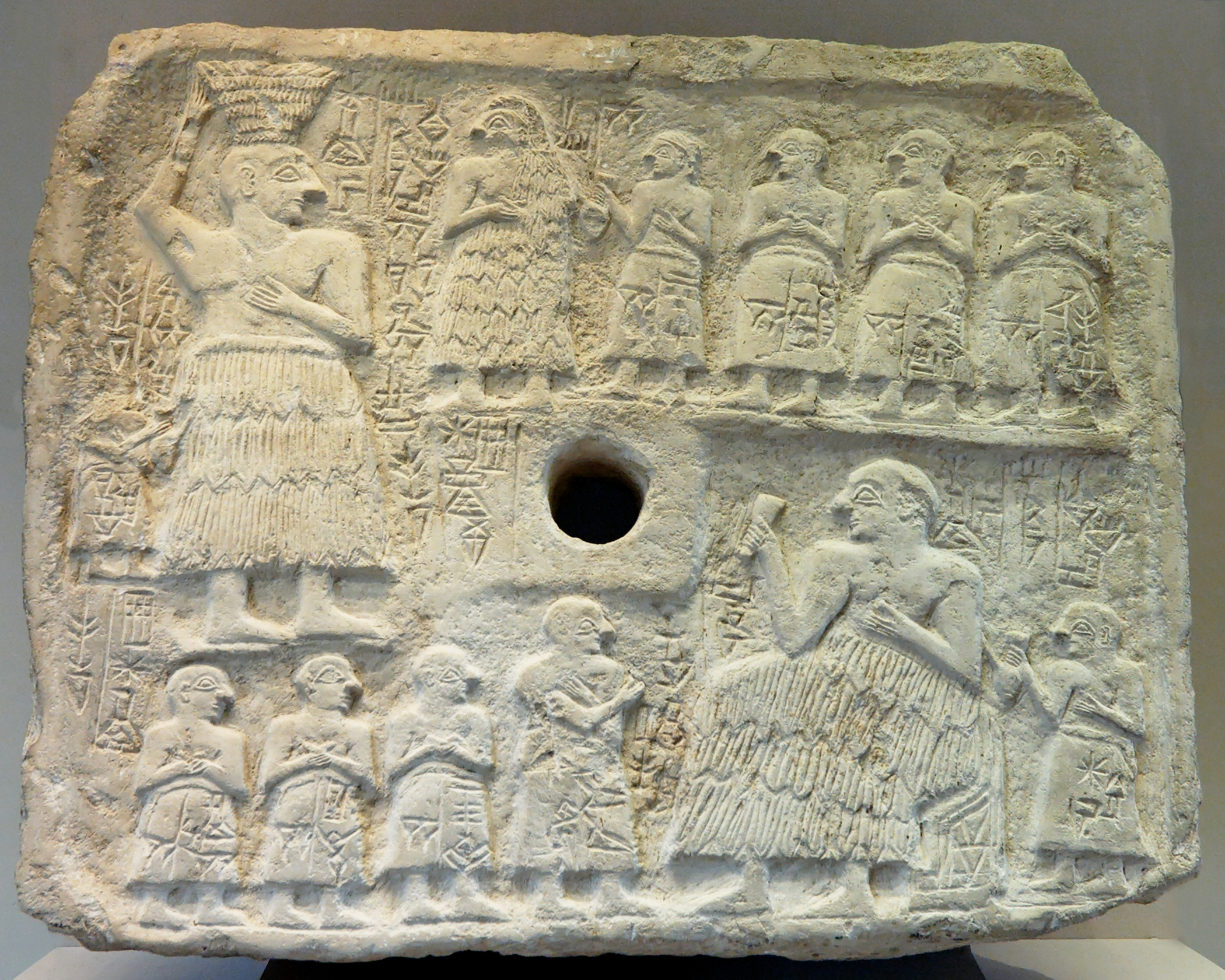
Ur-Nanshe: top, creating the foundation for a shrine; bottom, presiding over its dedication (Louvre)

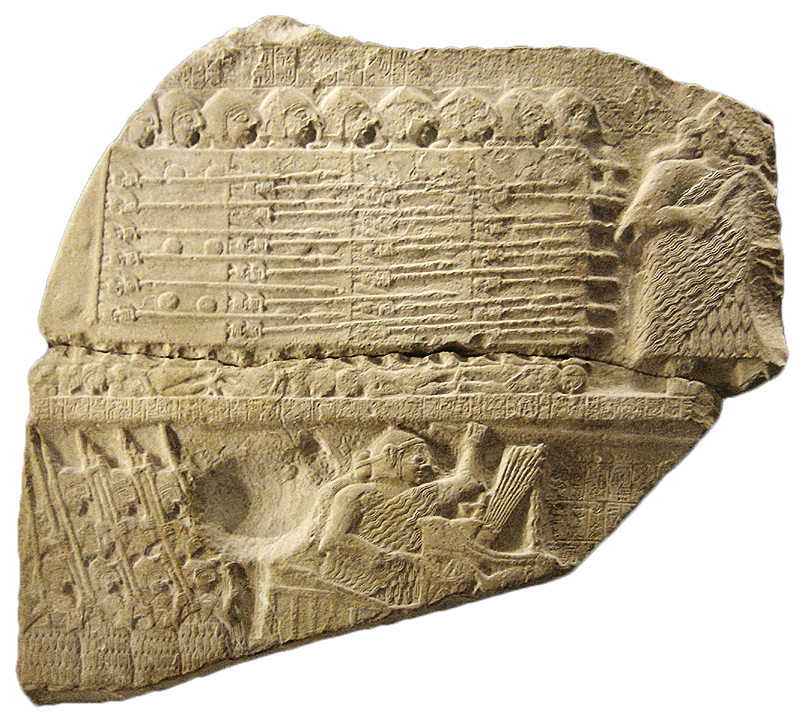
Fragment of Eannatum's Stele of the Vultures (Louvre)

This dynasty is dated to the 25th century BC. En-hegal is recorded as the first known ruler of Lagash, being tributary to Uruk. His successor Lugal-sha-engur was similarly tributary to Mesilim. Following the hegemony of Mesannepada of Ur, Ur-Nanshe succeeded Lugal-sha-engur as the new high priest of Lagash and achieved independence, making himself king. He defeated Ur and captured the king of Umma, Pabilgaltuk. In the ruins of a building attached by him to the temple of Ningirsu, terracotta bas reliefs of the king and his sons have been found, as well as onyx plates and lions' heads in onyx reminiscent of Egyptian work. One inscription states that ships of Dilmun (Bahrain) brought him wood as tribute from foreign lands. He was succeeded by his son Akurgal.

Eannatum, grandson of Ur-Nanshe, made himself master of the whole of the district of Sumer, together with the cities of Uruk (ruled by Enshakushana), Ur, Nippur, Akshak, and Larsa. He also annexed the kingdom of Kish; however, it recovered its independence after his death. Umma was made tributary—a certain amount of grain being levied upon each person in it, that had to be paid into the treasury of the goddess Nina and the god Ningirsu. Eannatum's campaigns extended beyond the confines of Sumer, and he overran a part of Elam, took the city of Az on the Persian Gulf, and exacted tribute as far as Mari; however many of the realms he conquered were often in revolt. During his reign, temples and palaces were repaired or erected at Lagash and elsewhere; the town of Nina—that probably gave its name to the later Niniveh—was rebuilt, and canals and reservoirs were excavated. Eannatum was succeeded by his brother, En-anna-tum I. During his rule, Umma once more asserted independence under Ur-Lumma, who attacked Lagash unsuccessfully. Ur-Lumma was replaced by a priest-king, Illi, who also attacked Lagash.

His son and successor Entemena restored the prestige of Lagash. Illi of Umma was subdued, with the help of his ally Lugal-kinishe-dudu or Lugal-ure of Uruk, successor to Enshakushana and also on the king-list. Lugal-kinishe-dudu seems to have been the prominent figure at the time, since he also claimed to rule Kish and Ur. A silver vase dedicated by Entemena to his god is now in the Louvre. A frieze of lions devouring ibexes and deer, incised with great artistic skill, runs round the neck, while the eagle crest of Lagash adorns the globular part. The vase is a proof of the high degree of excellence to which the goldsmith's art had already attained. A vase of calcite, also dedicated by Entemena, has been found at Nippur. After Entemena, a series of weak, corrupt priest-kings is attested for Lagash. The last of these, Urukagina, was known for his judicial, social, and economic reforms, and his may well be the first legal code known to have existed.

=== Empire of Lugal-zage-si of Uruk ===
Urukagina (c. 2359–2335 BC short chronology) was overthrown and his city Lagash captured by Lugal-zage-si, the high priest of Umma. Lugal-zage-si also took Uruk and Ur, and made Uruk his capital. In a long inscription that he made engraved on hundreds of stone vases dedicated to Enlil of Nippur, he boasts that his kingdom extended "from the Lower Sea (Persian Gulf), along the Tigris and Euphrates, to the Upper Sea" or Mediterranean. His empire was overthrown by Sargon of Akkad.

== Akkadian Empire ==
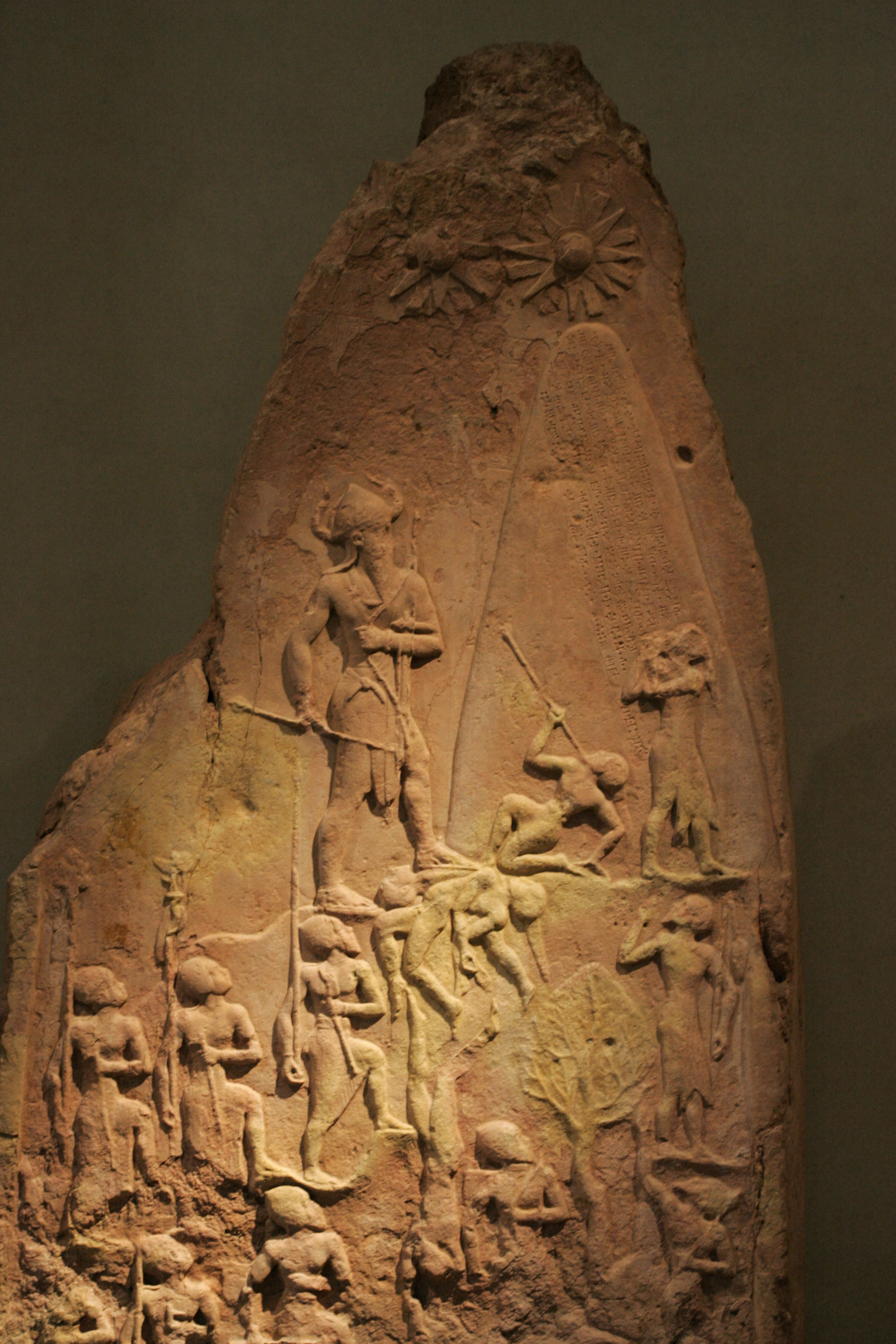
Victory stele of Naram-Sin at the Louvre, Paris.

The Akkadian period lasted c. 2334–2147 BC (middle chronology). The following is a list of known kings of this period:

| Sargon | c. 2334–2279 BC | |
| Rimush | c. 2278–2270 BC | younger son of Sargon |
| Manishtushu | c. 2269–2255 BC | elder son of Sargon |
| Naram-Sin | c. 2254–2218 BC | son of Man-ishtishu |
| Shar-Kali-Sharri | c. 2217–2193 BC | son of Naram-Suen |
| Igigi | | |
| Imi | | |
| Nanum | | |
| Elulu | | |
| Dudu | c. 2189–2168 BC | |
| Shu-turul | c. 2168–2147 BC | Akkad defeated by the Gutians |

== Gutian period ==
Following the fall of Sargon's Empire to the Gutians, a brief "Dark Ages" ensued. This period lasted c. 2141–2050 BC (short chronology).

== Second Dynasty of Lagash ==
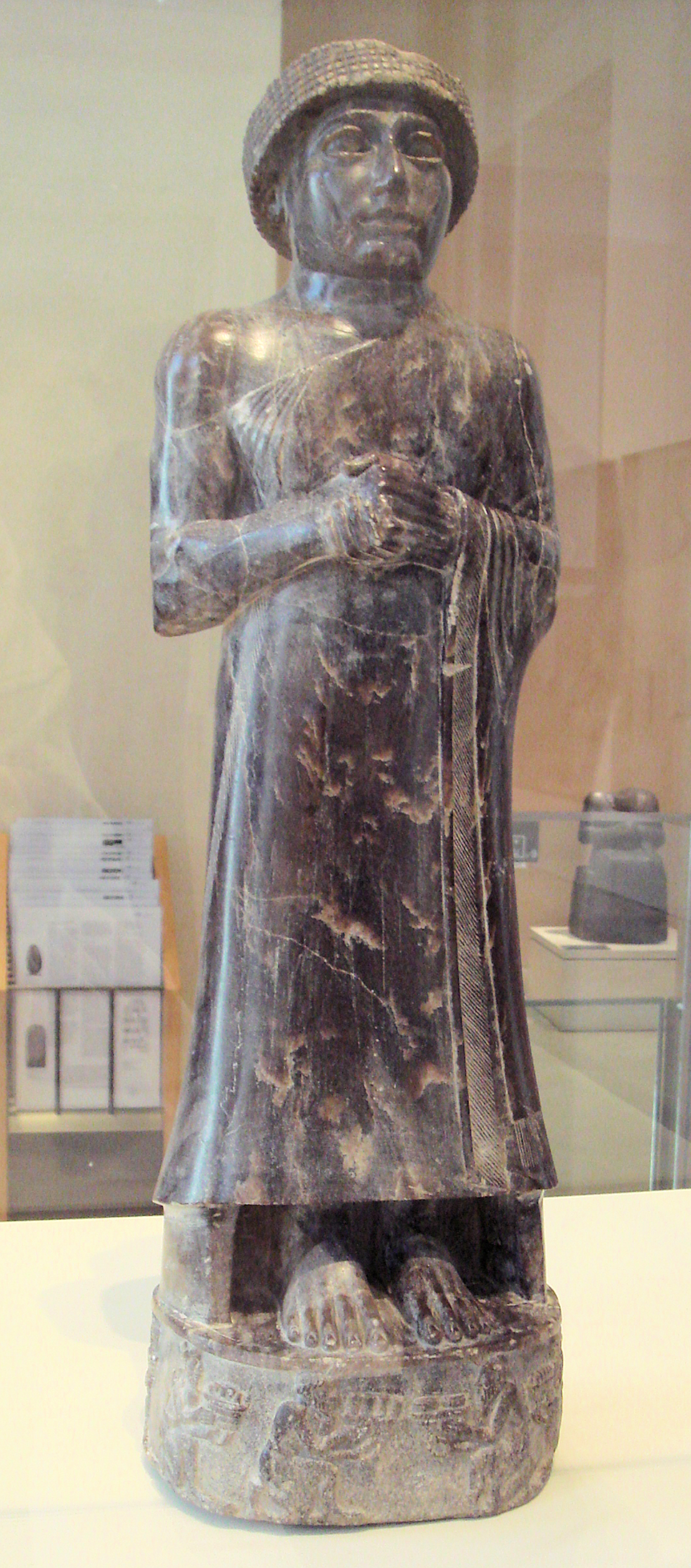
Statue of Ur-Ningirsu, prince of Lagash, circa 2110 BCE. Louvre Museum.

This period lasted c. 2260–2110 BC.

| King | Date | Notes |
|---|---|---|
| Ki-Ku-Id | | |
| Engilsa | | |
| Ur-A | | |
| Lugalushumgal | | |
| Puzer-Mama | c. 2200 BC | contemporary of Shar-kali-sharri of Akkad |
| Ur-Utu | | |
| Ur-Mama | | |
| Lu-Baba | | |
| Lugula | | |
| Kaku or Kakug | | |
| Ur-Bau or Ur-baba | c. 2093–2080 BC (short) | |
| Gudea | c. 2080–2060 BC | son-in-law of Ur-baba |
| Ur-Ningirsu | c. 2060–2055 BC | son of Gudea |
| Pirigme or Ugme | c. 2055–2053 BC | |
| Ur-gar | c. 2053–2049 BC | |
| Nammahani | c. 2049–2046 BC | grandson of Kaku, defeated by Ur-Nammu |

== Fifth Dynasty of Uruk ==
This dynasty lasted between c. 2055–2048 BC short chronology. The Gutians were ultimately driven out by the Sumerians under Utu-hegal, the only king of this dynasty, who in turn was defeated by Ur-Nammu of Ur.

== Third Dynasty of Ur ==
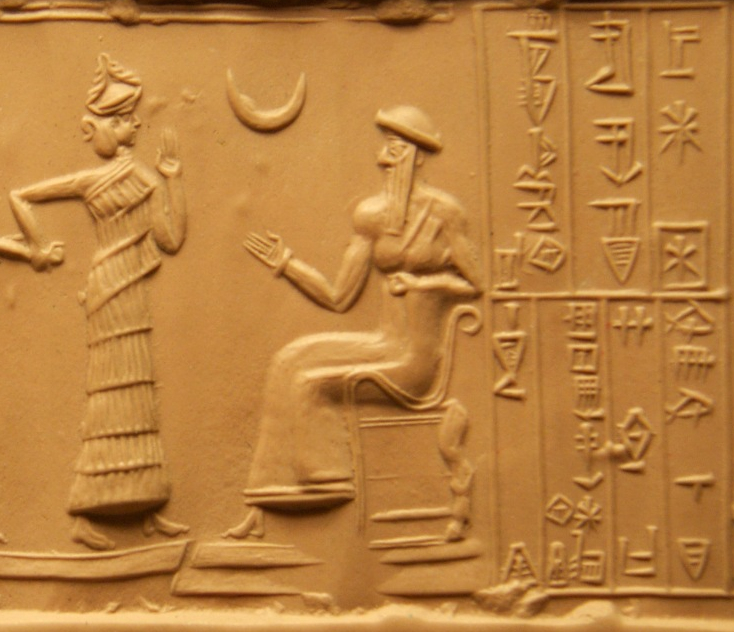
Enthroned King Ur-Nammu, founder of the Third Dynasty of Ur, on a cylinder seal.

The Third Dynasty of Ur is dated to c. 2047–1940 BC short chronology. Ur-Nammu of Ur defeated Utu-hegal of Uruk and founded the Third Dynasty of Ur. Although the Sumerian language ("Emegir") was again made official, Sumerian identity was already in decline, as the population became continually absorbed into the Akkadian (Assyro-Babylonian) population.

After the Ur III dynasty was destroyed by the Elamites in 2004 BC, a fierce rivalry developed between the city-states of Larsa, more under Elamite than Sumerian influence, and Isin, that was more Amorite (as the Western Semitic nomads were called). Archaeologically, the fall of the Ur III dynasty corresponds to the beginning of the Middle Bronze Age. The Semites ended up prevailing in Mesopotamia by the time of Hammurabi of Babylon, who founded the Babylonian Empire, and the language and name of Sumer gradually passed into the realm of antiquarian scholars. Nevertheless, Sumerian influence on Babylonia, and all subsequent cultures in the region, was undeniably great.

During the third millennium BC, there developed a very intimate cultural symbiosis between the Sumerians and the Akkadians, which included widespread bilingualism. The influence of Sumerian on Akkadian (and vice versa) is evident in all areas, from lexical borrowing on a massive scale, to syntactic, morphological, and phonological convergence. This has prompted scholars to refer to Sumerian and Akkadian in the third millennium as a sprachbund.

Akkadian gradually replaced Sumerian as the spoken language of Mesopotamia somewhere around the turn of the third and the second millennium BC (the exact dating being a matter of debate), but Sumerian continued to be used as a sacred, ceremonial, literary and scientific language in Mesopotamia until the first century AD.

== Historiography ==
The study of Mesopotamian origins has undergone a significant paradigm shift over the last three decades, marking a departure from the environmental and economic determinism that dominated 20th-century scholarship. For decades, the field was defined by the belief that logistical demands—specifically large-scale water management—forced the creation of centralized, authoritarian states. In this materialistic framework, religion and ideology were viewed as "superstructures" that arose to justify the control of production. Other materialist models, such as Robert Carneiro’s "Circumscription Theory," similarly viewed the city as a byproduct of population pressure and conflict over limited resources.

Modern historiography, however, represents a key turning point by inverting this hierarchy. Contemporary consensus, supported by the archaeological surveys of Robert McCormick Adams Jr., suggests that urban growth often preceded massive canal engineering, effectively dismantling the causal link of the hydraulic model. Consequently, the former "superstructure" is now recognized as the causal foundation, with monumental ritual spaces often preceding settled agriculture. As Klaus Schmidt argues based on the evidence from Göbekli Tepe, the urge to worship and the social organization required for monumental building acted as the primary catalyst for the eventual settlement and domestication of the landscape.

=== Connection to the History of Marxism ===
The paradigm shift in Mesopotamian archaeology has had profound implications for Marxist archaeology, specifically upending the classic tenet of "base and superstructure." In traditional historical materialism, the economic "base" (the productive forces and relations of production, such as irrigation and agriculture) was believed to strictly determine the "superstructure" (ideology, religion, and law). For much of the 20th century, this framework—popularized by V. Gordon Childe—dominated the field, positing that the city was a byproduct of economic surplus and social stratification necessitated by material conditions.

However, the "ideological turn" in the recent historiography of early Mesopotamia has effectively challenged this relationship. By demonstrating that monumental ritual centers and complex social organization often preceded the establishment of an agricultural base—most notably in the transition from the Late Neolithic to the Uruk period—researchers have questioned the notion that religion is merely a secondary justification for economic control. Instead, scholars now argue for a "symbolic revolutionary" model, where the shared mental maps and cultic requirements of the community provided the organizational "blueprint" that made the subsequent economic transition possible. This shift suggests that the Urban Revolution was a volitional, culturally driven project, forcing a move away from the mechanical determinism of 20th-century Marxism toward a more nuanced, "dialectical" understanding of how ideology and environment interact.

=== A Note on "Cradle(s)" ===
A central debate in Near Eastern historiography concerns whether Mesopotamia represents the unique "Single Cradle" of civilization or merely one of several independent origins. The diffusionist position argues that the fundamental blueprints of urban life—writing, bureaucracy, and monumental architecture—were primary Mesopotamian innovations that subsequently "sparked" development in other regions through trade and cultural contact. In contrast, the now-predominant "multiple cradles" model posits that civilizational traits emerged autonomously in various global centers as independent responses to similar environmental thresholds.

Critiques of this consensus often highlight the institutional and nationalistic pressures that may favor the "multiple cradles" narrative. Scholars have noted that the institutional framework of international heritage organizations can incentivize the adoption of autochthonous models to satisfy the diplomatic requirements of member states. Furthermore, the "political economy" of archaeological practice can create an environment of professional self-censorship regarding the true extent of Mesopotamian influence. In this view, the requirement for maintaining positive relations with host-nation governments—who often view "primary" status as a matter of national prestige—can dictate what is allowed to be found or published. Consequently, some historians argue that the "multiple cradles" model is maintained as much by the pragmatic requirements of international cooperation as by empirical data.

== See also ==
- History of Mesopotamia
- Jawa
- List of Mesopotamian dynasties
- History of institutions in Mesopotamia
