= Lugal-ushumgal =

Sumerian king, c. 2230–2210 BC

Lugal-ushumgal 𒈗𒃲𒁔
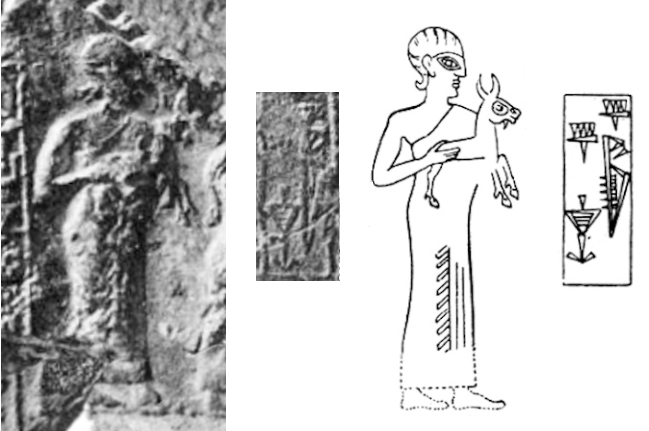
- Lugal-ushumgal, ensi of Lagash, carrying an animal offering for a deity, c. 2200 BC

King of Lagash
- Reign: c. 2230 - c. 2210 BC
- Successor: Puzer-Mama
- Died: c. 2210 BC
- Dynasty: 2nd Dynasty of Lagash

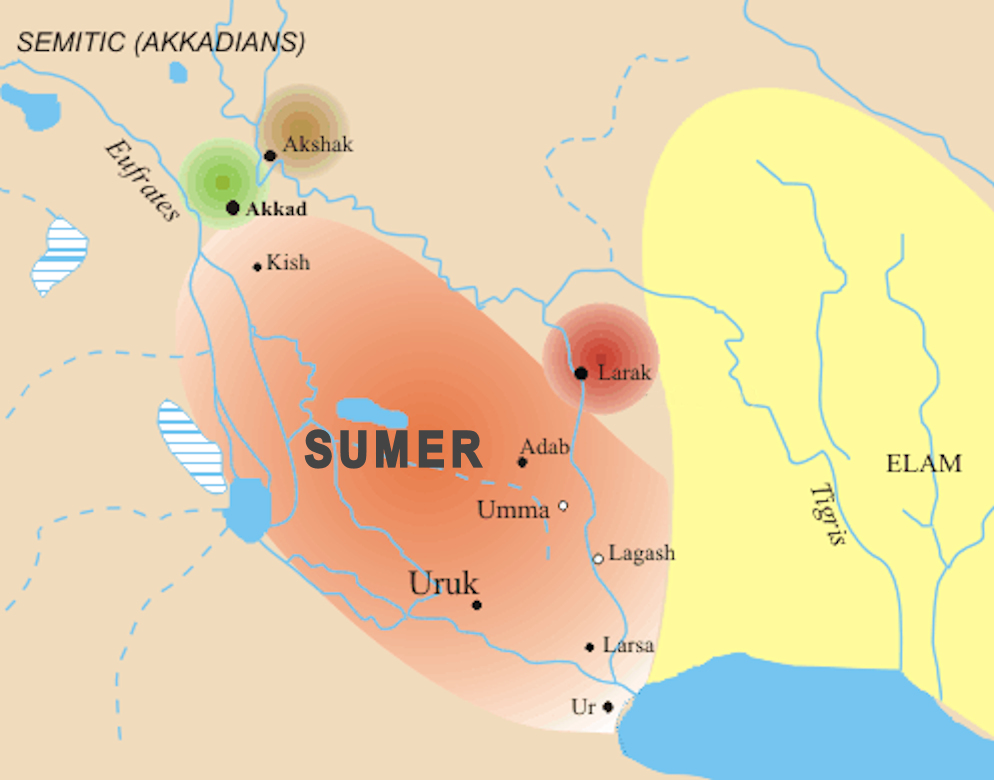
Lugal-ushumgal was governor of Lagash, at the extreme south of Mesopotamia

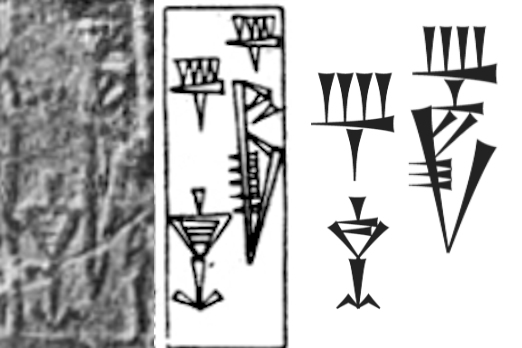
The name "Lugal-ushumgal" on seal impressions, and with standard Sumero-Akkadian cuneiforms

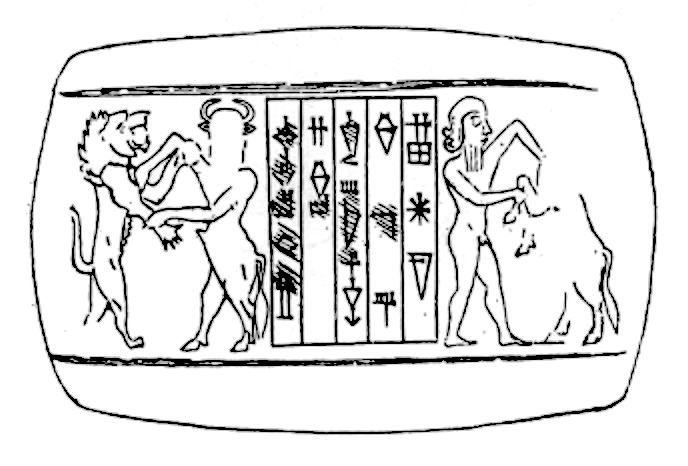
A seal of "Sibni (𒉺𒇻𒀭𒉌), policeman (𒋼𒇲𒃲, gallagal), servant of Lugal-ushumgal, ensi of Lagash"

Purchase contract
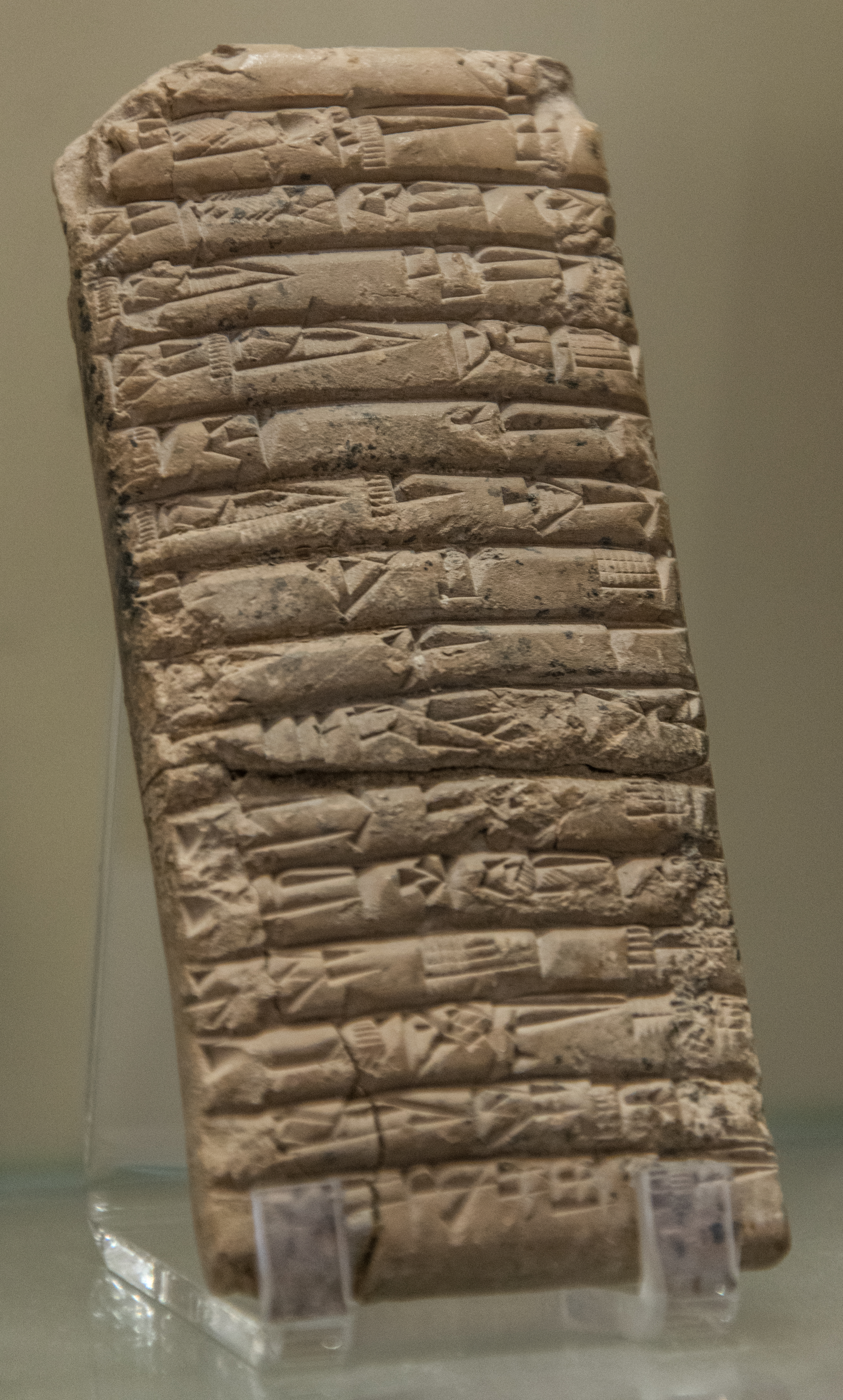
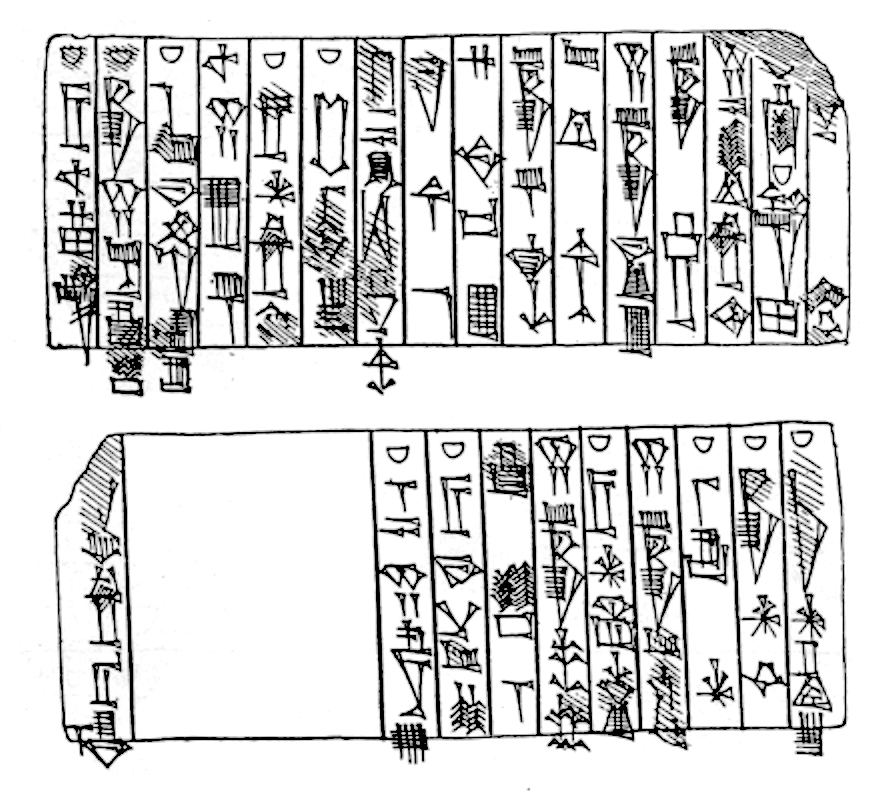
Purchase of a female slave by Lugal-ushumgal, vassal of Naram-Sin. Louvre Museum AO 2689

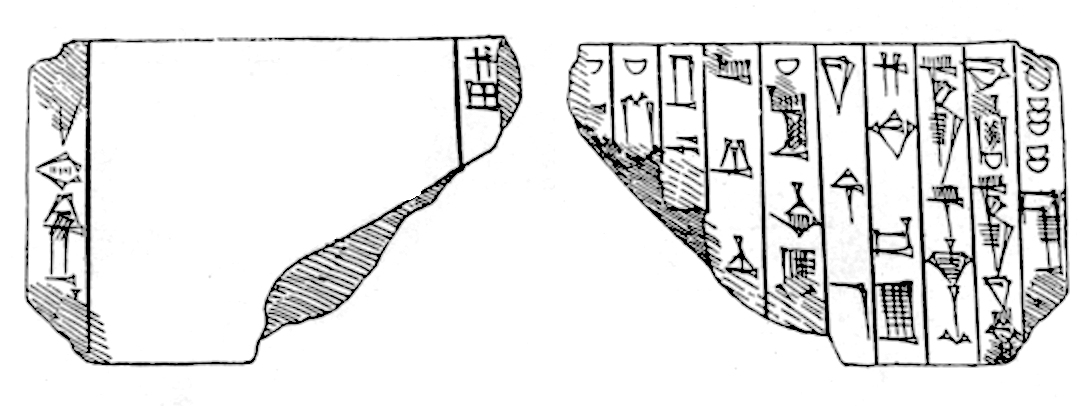
Contract in the name of "Governor Lugal-ushumgal"

Lugal-ushumgal (𒈗𒃲𒁔, lugal-ušumgal; died c. 2210 BC) was a Sumerian ruler (ensi, formerly read "Patesi") of Lagash ("Shirpula"), c. 2230 – c. 2210 BC. Several inscriptions of Lugal-ushumgal are known, particularly seal impressions, which refer to him as governor of Lagash and at the same time a vassal (𒀵, arad, "servant" or "slave") of the Akkadian Empire rulers Naram-Sin and his successor Shar-Kali-Sharri.

It can be considered that Lugalushumgal was a collaborator of the Akkadian Empire, as was Meskigal, ruler of Adab.

He was succeeded by Puzer-Mama who achieved independence from Shar-Kali-Sharri, assuming the title of "King of Lagash" and starting the illustrious Second Dynasty of Lagash.

== Seal of Lugalushumgal as vassal of Naram-sin ==
The seal depicts a presentation scene of governor Lugal-ushumgal to a male deity. Lugal-ushumgal is shown standing to the left, carrying an animal offering for the deity. The inscription carries two blocks of columns:

𒀭𒈾𒊏𒄠𒀭𒂗𒍪 𒁕𒈝 𒀭𒀀𒂵𒉈𒆠 𒈗 𒆠𒅁𒊏𒁴 𒅈𒁀𒅎 𒈗𒃲𒁔 𒁾𒊬 𒑐𒋼𒋛 𒉢𒁓𒆷𒆠 𒀵𒋢
^{D}Na-ra-am ^{D}Sîn da-num ^{D}a-ga-de^{ki} lugal ki-ibradim arbaim lugal-ušumgal dub-sar ensi lagash^{ki} arad_{2}-su

"Naram-Sin, the mighty God of Agade, king of the four corners of the world, Lugalushumgal, the scribe, ensi of Lagash, is thy servant."

— Seal of Lugalushumgal as vassal of Naram-sin.

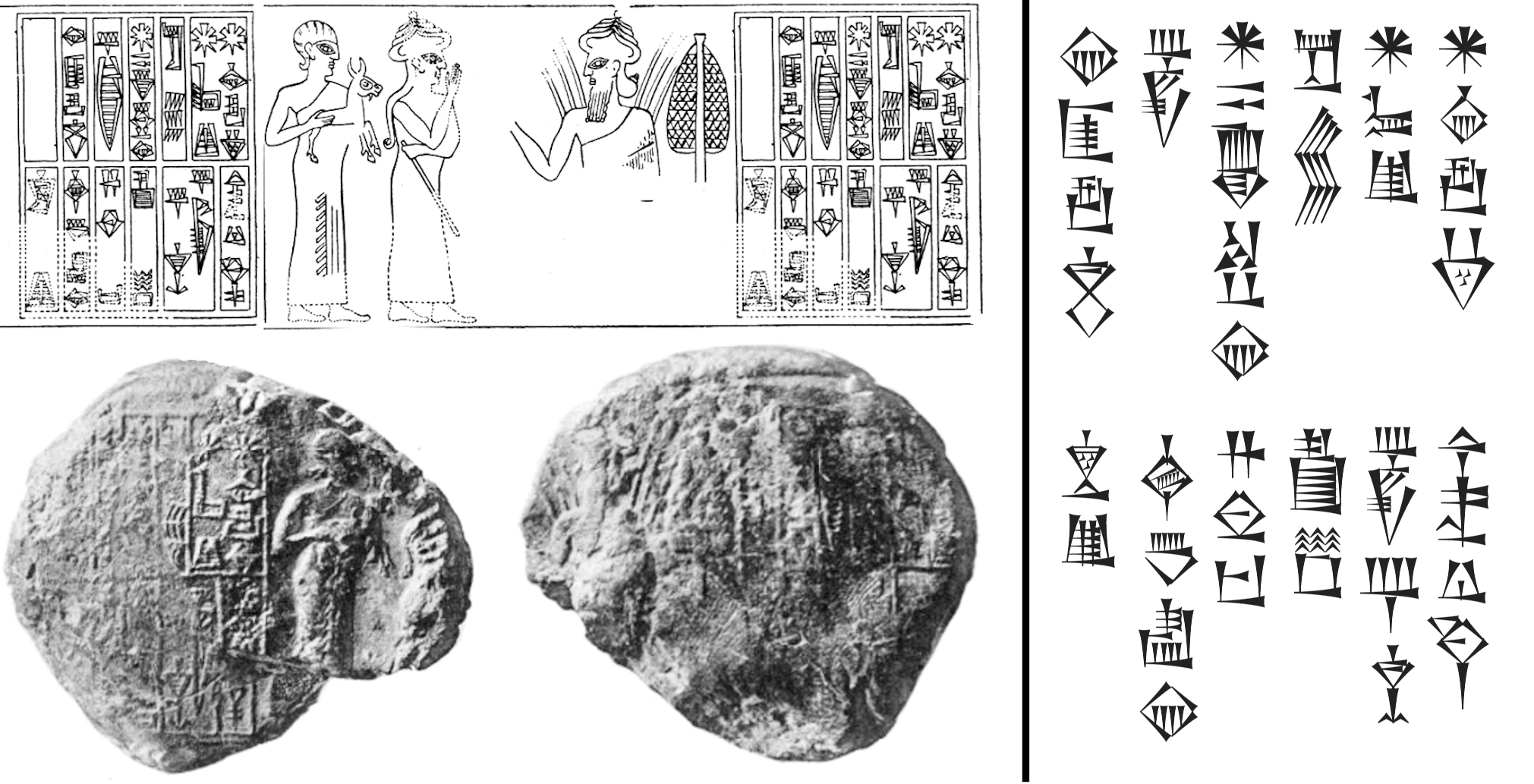
Seal impression of Lugal-ushumgal as servant of Naram-Sin: "Naram-Sin the mighty god of Agade, king of the four corners of the world, Lugalushumgal, the scribe, ensi of Lagash, is thy servant."

== Seal of Lugalushumgal as vassal of Shar-Kali-Sharri ==
Prism of Lugal-ushumgal
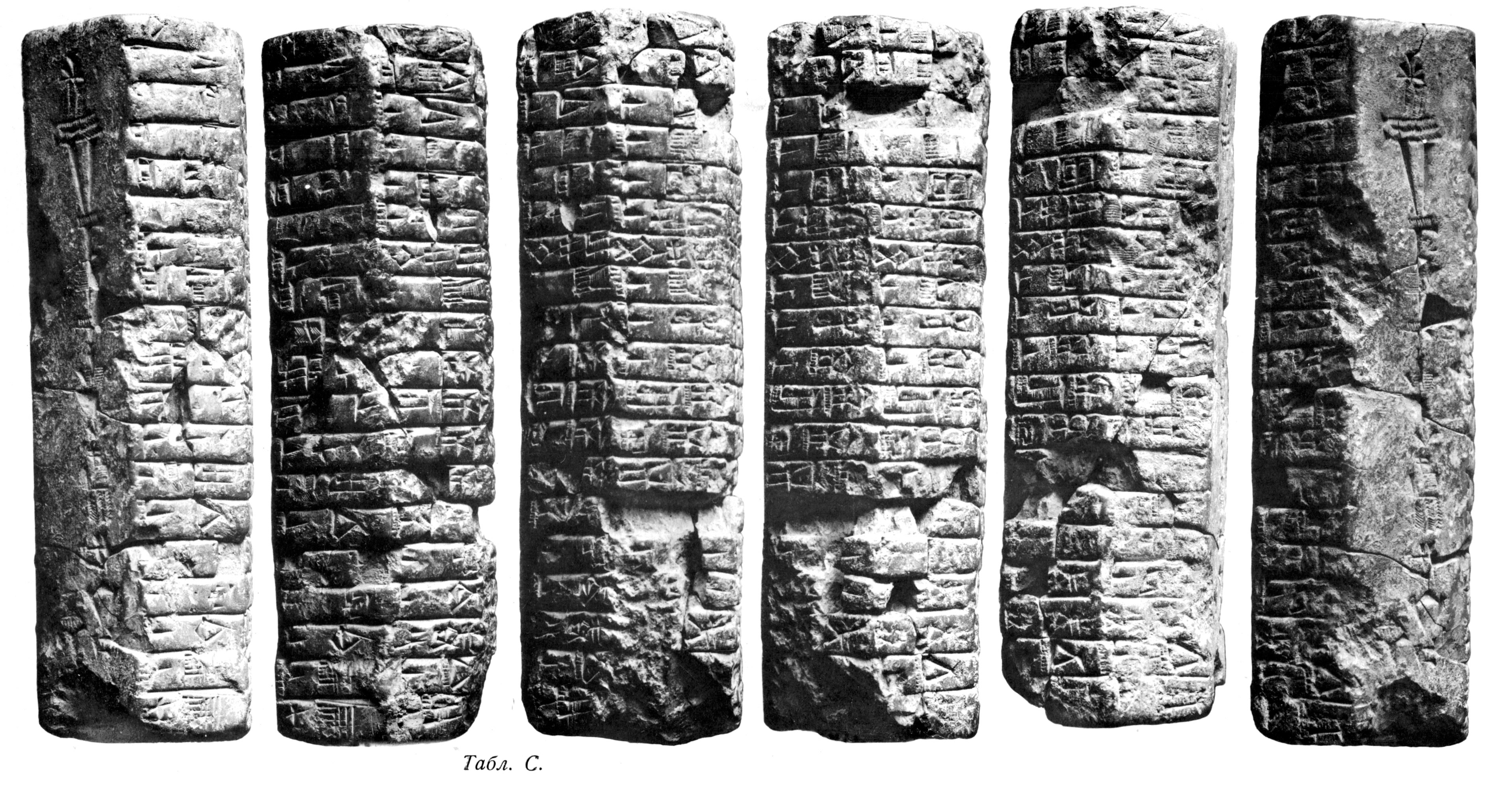
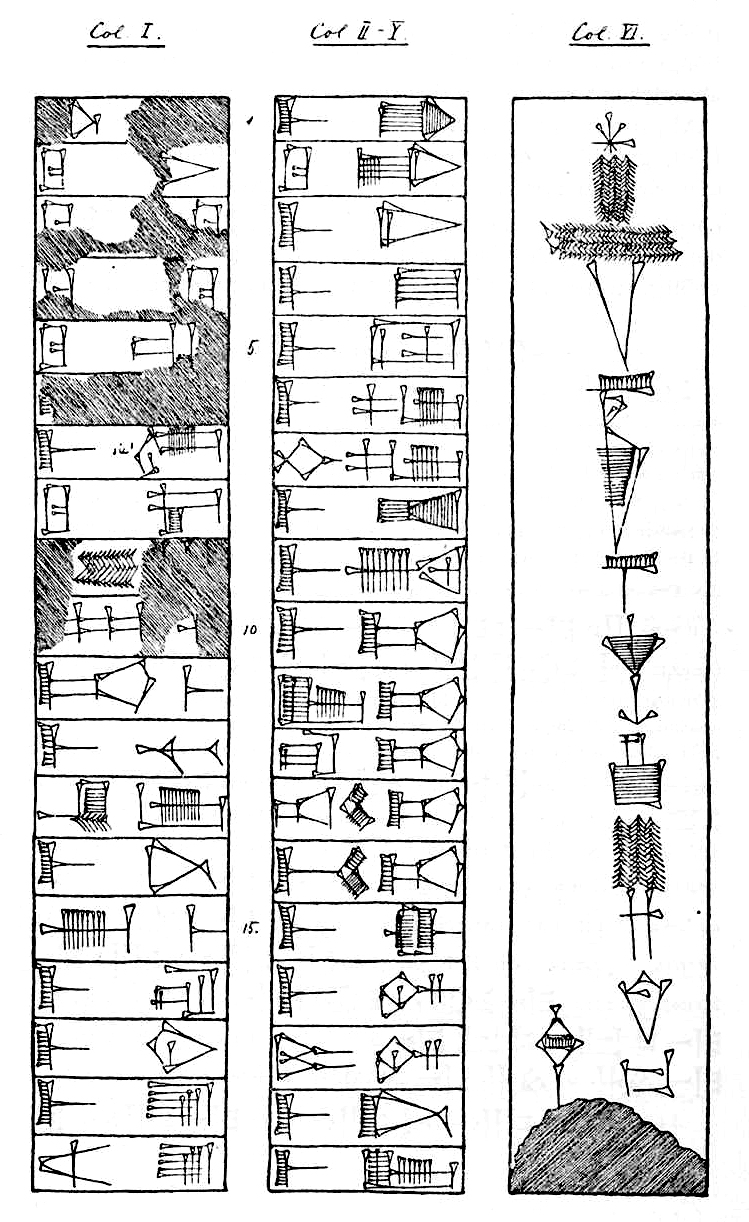
The prism of Lugal-ushumgal: an elegant list of known crafts, finished by a long signature "Lugal-ushumgal, scribe and governor of Lagash.

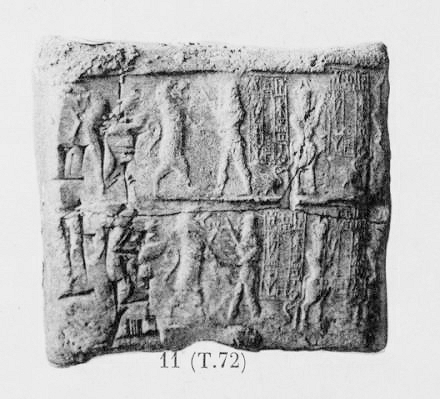
Seal of Ur-Ninmar, son of Lugal-ushumgal

The second seal again shows a presentation scene of governor Lugal-ushumgal to a seated deity. Lugal-ushumgal is shown standing to the left, carrying an animal offering for the deity. The inscription carries two blocks of columns:

𒊬𒂵𒉌 𒈗𒌷 𒁕𒈝 𒈗 𒀀𒂵𒉈𒆠 𒈗𒃲𒁔 𒑐𒋼𒋛 𒉢𒁓𒆷𒆠 𒀵𒋢
Shar-kali-sharri da-num lugal a-ga-de^{ki} lugal-ušumgal ensi lagash^{ki} arad_{2}-su

"Shar-kali-sharri, the mighty king of Agade, Lugalushumgal, ensi of Lagash, is thy servant."

— Seal of Lugalushumgal as vassal of Shar-Kali-Sharri.

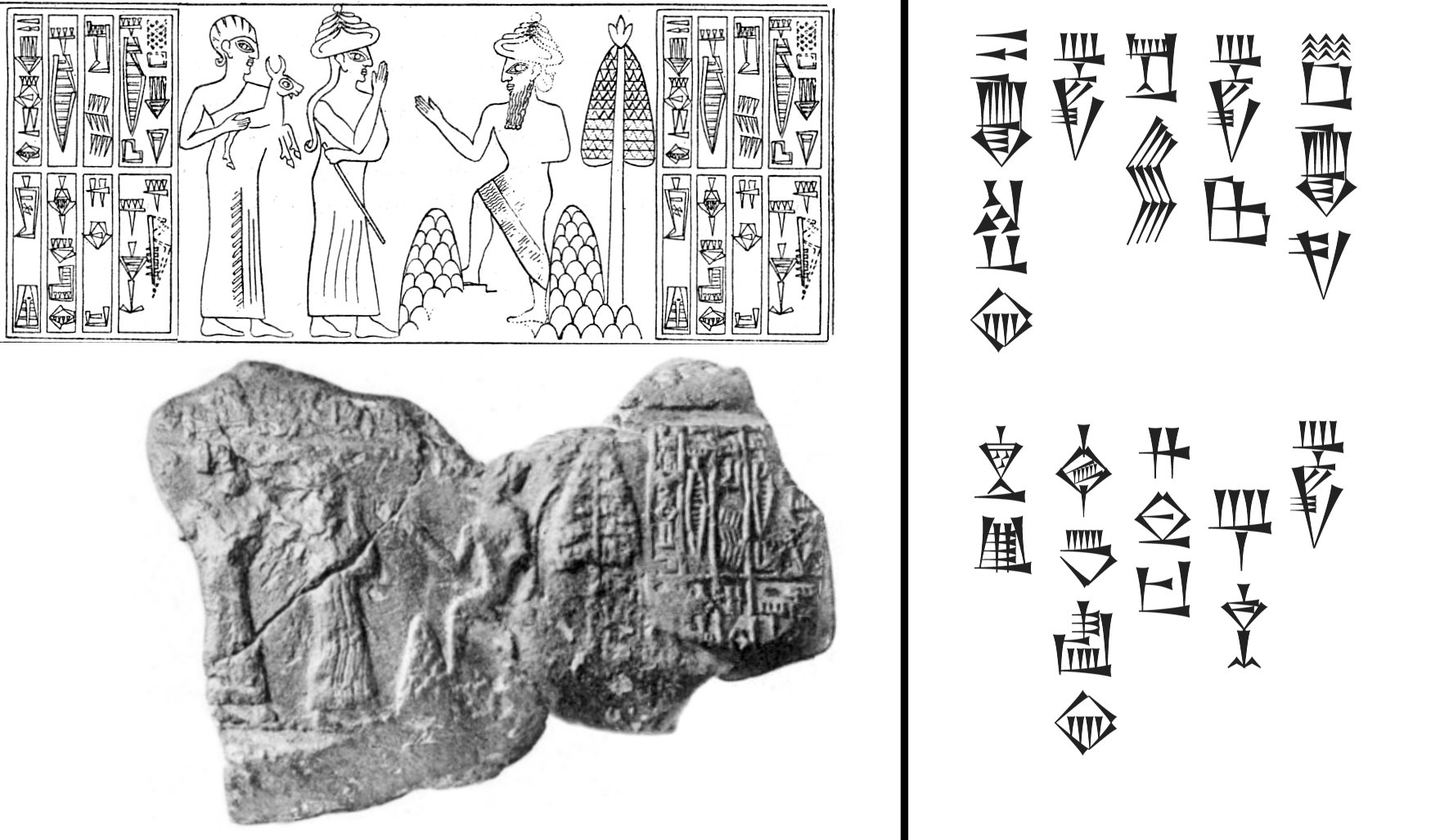
Seal impression of Lugal-ushumgal as servant of Shar-Kali-Sharri: "Sharkalisharri, the mighty king of Agade, Lugalushumgal, ensi of Lagash, is thy servant."

== Sources ==
- Frayne, Douglas R. (1993). Sargonic and Gutian Periods (Toronto, Buffalo, London. University of Toronto Press Incorporated)

Regnal titles
Preceded by	King of Lagash c. 2230 - c. 2210 BC	Succeeded by Puzer-Mama
