= Puzer-Mama =

Sumerian king, 23rd century BC

Puzer-Mama 𒅤𒊭𒀭𒈠𒈠

King of Lagash
- Reign: c. 2210 - c. 2200 BC
- Predecessor: Lugal-ushumgal
- Successor: Possibly Ur-Ningirsu I
- Died: c. 2200 BC
- Dynasty: 2nd Dynasty of Lagash

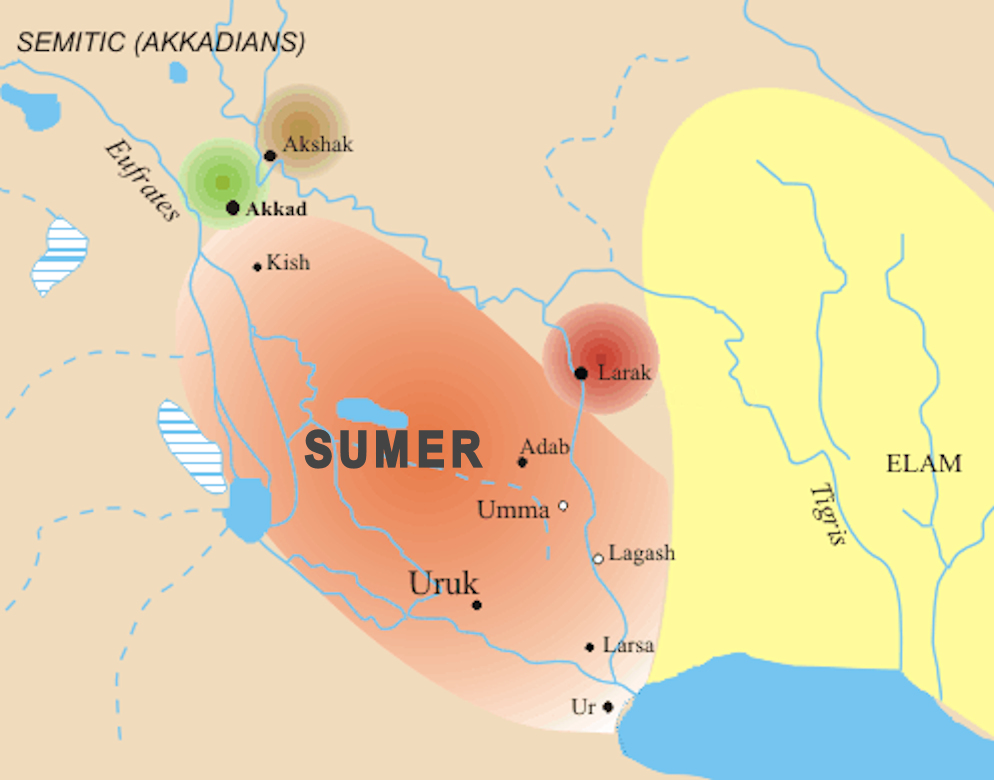
Puzer-Mama was king of Lagash, at the extreme south of Mesopotamia

Puzer-Mama or Puzur-Mama (𒅤𒊭𒀭𒈠𒈠, puzur_{4}-^{D}ma-ma; died c. 2200 BC) was a ruler of Lagash before Gudea. Though he adopted the title of King (lugal), Puzer-Mama shows kinship with future Lagashite governors (ensi) in the religiosity of his inscriptions.

He took control of Lagash during Shar-Kali-Sharri's reign, when troubles with the Guti left the Sargonic king with only "a small rump state whose center lay at the confluence of the Diyala and Tigris river." (Frayne 1993 p. 186)

Puzer-Mama's royal inscription — wherein he receives the various gifts of the gods appropriate to rulership: power by Ningirsu, intelligence by Enki, and position by Inanna, (Frayne 1993 p. 272) — may be contrasted with the contemporary religious element in Shar-kali-sharri's various inscriptions: a call for the gods to punish any who alter his inscriptions, and specifically to "tear out his foundations and destroy his progeny" (one of a number of curses for protection found in royal inscriptions starting with the reign of Sargon.)

Puzer-Mama appears in Babylonian inscription (BM 2310) as one of the ancient rulers of Lagash, particularly the list of "The rulers of Lagaš":

"Puzur-Mama, scribe of Ninki: his god was Zazaru: he acted for .. years."

— "The rulers of Lagaš"

According to other inscriptions however, his tutelary god was Shulutula.

Puzur-Mama also appears in a letter about territorial disputes between two Governors, apparently sent to Shar-Kali-Sharri:

(Say to my Lord): This is what Puzur-Mama, Governor of Lagash, said: Sulum and e-apin since the time of Sargon belonged to the territory of Lagash. Ur-Utu, when he served as Governor of Ur for Naram-Sin, paid 2 minas of gold for them. Ur-e, Governor of Lagash, took them back. The consequence is that Puzur-Mama should (....)

— Letter about Puzur-Mama.

Puzer-Mama also appears as "King of Lagash" in a document also naming the Elamite ruler Puzur-Inshushinak, suggesting the synchronicity of the two rulers.

== Sources ==
- Frayne, Douglas R. (1993). Sargonic and Gutian Periods (Toronto, Buffalo, London. University of Toronto Press Incorporated)

Regnal titles
Preceded by Lugal-ushumgal	King of Lagash c. 2210 - c. 2200 BC	Succeeded by Possibly Ur-Ningirsu I
