= Georges Dossin =

Belgian archaeologist

Georges Gilles Joseph Dossin (French pronunciation: [ʒɔʁʒə ʒil ʒozɛf dosɛ̃]; 4 February 1896, in Wandre, near Liège – 8 December 1983, in Liège) was a Belgian archaeologist, Assyriologist and art historian.

== Biography ==
He studied in Liège and Paris, earning doctorates in classical philology (1921) and oriental history and literature (1923). From 1924 to 1945 he taught classes on the art history of Asia Minor at the Institut Royal d'Histoire de l'Art et d'Archeologie de Bruxelles, and in the meantime, taught various courses in the fields of art history and archaeology at the University of Liège (1924–1935); classes in Akkadian language at the Institut des Hautes Études de Belgique in Brussels (1929–39), and classes in oriental history and Assyro-Babylonian languages at the Université libre de Bruxelles (1935–1941).

After World War II, he continued work as a lecturer at the Institut des Hautes Études de Belgique (1945–1955) and at the Université libre de Bruxelles (1946–1951), eventually serving as a professor of Assyriology and comparative grammar of Semitic languages at the University of Liège (1951–1966).

Under the directorship of François Thureau-Dangin, he performed excavatory work at Arslan Tash (1928) and Til-Barsip (1931) in northern Syria, and later on, spent a number years working with André Parrot at the excavation site of Mari (1937–1939, 1951–1953). Dossin is credited with deciphering thousands of ancient tablets.

He was a member of the Académie royale des sciences, des lettres et des beaux-arts de Belgique and a membre correspondant étranger of the Académie des Inscriptions et Belles-Lettres (1944). With Thureau-Dangin, he was co-founder of the Rencontres Assyriologiques.

== Published works (selection) ==
- Autres textes sumériens et accadiens, 1927 – Other Sumerian and Akkadian texts.
- Arslan-Tash, 1931 (with François Thureau-Dangin).
- Lettres de la première dynastie babylonienne, 1933 – Letters on the First Babylonian Dynasty.
- Til-Barsib, 1936 (with François Thureau-Dangin).
- Benjaminites dans les textes de Mari, 1939 – Benjamites in the texts from Mari.
- Archives royales de Mari, 1946 (with André Parrot) – Royal archives of Mari.
