= François Thureau-Dangin =

French archaeologist, assyriologist and epigrapher

François Thureau-Dangin (3 January 1872 in Paris – 24 January 1944 in Paris) was a French archaeologist, assyriologist and epigrapher. He played a major role in deciphering of the Sumerian and Akkadian languages.

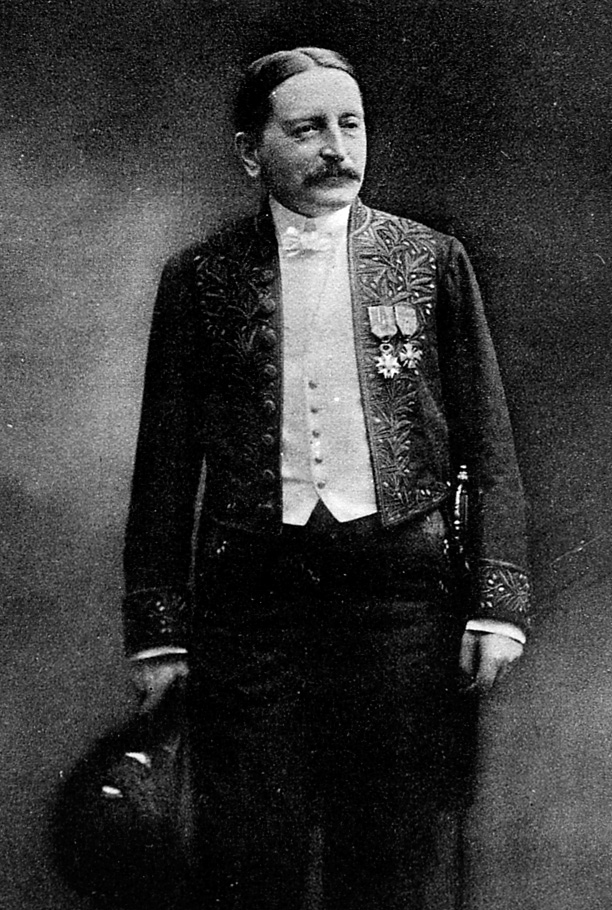
François Thureau-Dangin (1872–1944)

He studied under Julius Oppert in Paris, and from 1895, was associated with duties performed at the Louvre, where in 1908, he was appointed assistant curator of the Oriental Antiquities department, in French the département des Antiquités orientales where he spent most of his career and whom he led from 1925 to 1928. On behalf of the Louvre museum, he conducted then excavations at Arslan Tash (1927) and at Til Barsip (1929–1931).

He was a leading expert on Babylonian cuneiform texts, and worked on a theory concerning the origins of cuneiform writing, publishing the treatise Recherches sur l'origine de l'écriture cunéiforme (1898) as a result. In 1905 he published Les inscriptions de Sumer et d'Akkad. This work, containing a transcription and translation of Mesopotamian royal inscriptions from the Archaic period of Sumer to the second millennium BC., puts an end to the controversies over the origin of the cuneiform and marks a decisive stage in the deciphering of Sumerian. It will be followed in 1926 by an Accadian Syllabary (sic) and, in 1929, by Homomorphes sumériens.

In 1910, he created the Textes cunéiformes du Louvre (TCL) series and became the co-director of the Revue d'assyriologie et d'archéologie orientale (RA).

Along with Georges Dossin, he founded the Rencontre Assyriologique Internationale, an association of orientalists, which hosts international events. He was a member of the Académie des inscriptions et belles lettres and a corresponding fellow of the British Academy.

== Works (selection) ==
- Recherches sur l'origine de l'écriture cunéiforme, 1898 – Research on the origin of cuneiform writing.
- Recueil de tablettes chaldéennes, 1903 – Collection of Chaldean tablets.
- Inscriptions de Sumer et d'Akkad, 1905 – Inscriptions of Sumer and Akkad.
- Die sumerischen und akkadischen Königsinschriften, Hinrichs, Leipzig 1907 (Vorderasiatische Bibliothek, Bd. 1, Abt. 1; Neudruck 1972).
- Lettres et contrats de l'époque de la première dynastie babylonienne, 1910.
- Rituels accadiens. Leroux, Paris 1921 (Neudruck Zeller, Osnabrück 1975, ISBN 3-535-01494-8)
- Les cylindres de Goudéa découverts par Ernest de Sarzec à Tello. (54 planches), with Ernest de Sarzec, 1925 – The cylinders of Goudéa discovered by Ernest de Sarzec at Telloh.
- Le syllabaire accadien, 1926 – Akkadian syllabary.
- Textes mathématiques babyloniens. Brll, Leiden 1938 – Babylonian mathematical texts.

== Bibliography ==
- Joseph W. Dauben, Christoph J. Scriba (Hrsg.): Writing the history of mathematics. Its historical development. Birkhäuser, Basel u. a. 2002, ISBN 3-7643-6167-0, (Science networks 27).
