= Gudea =

Sumerian king of Lagash (died c. 2124 BC)

Gudea 𒅗𒌤𒀀
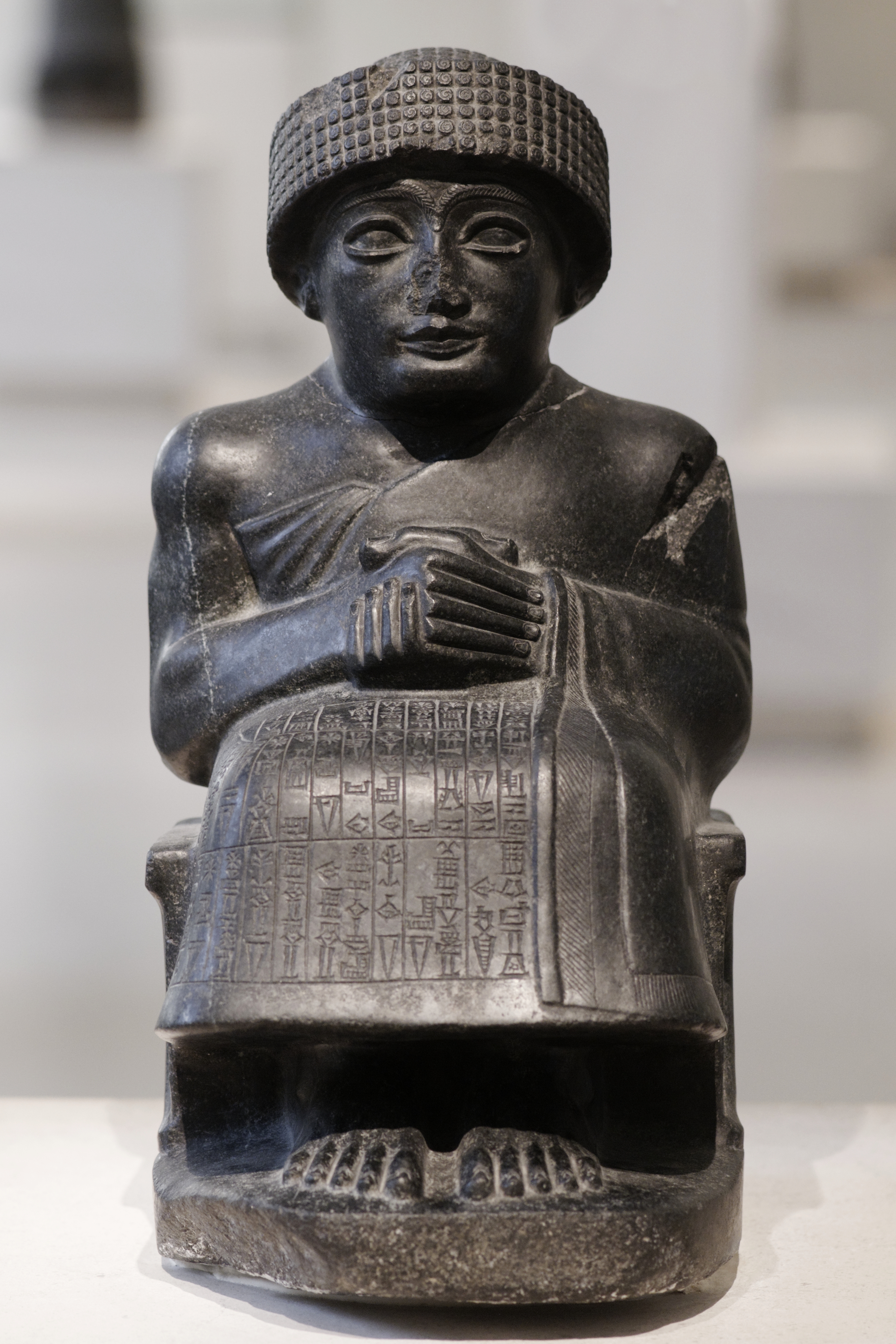
- Diorite statue of Gudea, prince of Lagash, dedicated to the god Ningishzida, Louvre Museum

King of Lagash
- Reign: c. 2144 – c. 2124 BC
- Predecessor: Ur-Bau
- Successor: Ur-Ningirsu II
- Died: c. 2124 BC
- Spouse: Ninalla
- Issue: Ur-Ningirsu II

Location of Lagash

Gudea (/ɡuː.ˈdeɪ.ə/, goo-DAY-ə; Sumerian: 𒅗𒌤𒀀, Gu_{3}-de_{2}-a) was a ruler of the city-state of Lagash, in southern Mesopotamia, in the land of Sumer. He reigned around 2150/2130-2120/2110 BC.

Gudea's reign took place during the period known as the Second Dynasty of Lagash, when the city regained its independence after the fall of the Akkadian Empire and before being incorporated into the Third Dynasty of Ur, probably at the end of his reign or shortly thereafter. Little is known about the political and military situation under Gudea: in his inscriptions, the king mentions only one military campaign and remains silent about relations with other kings.

Among Mesopotamian rulers, Gudea stands out because he was not a king whose warrior qualities were emphasized. His known activities primarily concern his pious deeds, notably the restoration of the great temples of his kingdom. He is best known for the numerous statues representing him, which he dedicated to the gods of his country as a sign of his great reverence for them. Several are made of diorite, an extremely hard black rock. His many inscriptions also relate to his pious activities, his two clay cylinders being among the finest examples of Sumerian literature.

After his death, the memory of Gudea endured for several generations in his country, a sign that his reign was considered significant. The numerous objects he left behind were unearthed during excavations at the site of Telloh, ancient Girsu, in the last quarter of the 19th century, and played a decisive role in the rediscovery of Sumerian civilization.

== Sources ==
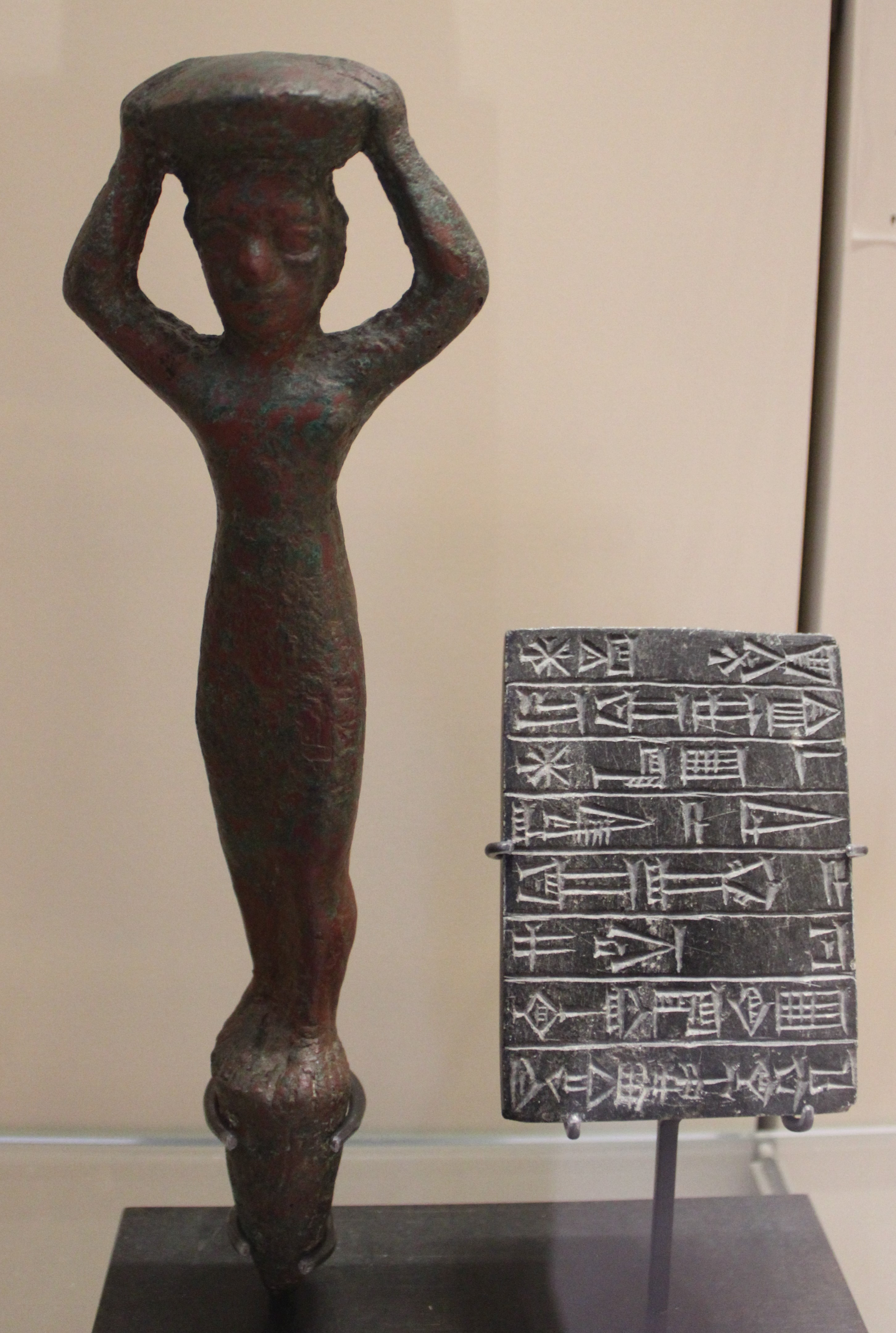
Copper alloy foundation nail, in the form of a figurine representing the king in his role as builder, carrying a basket of bricks on his head. The small diorite tablet, found at the same location, bears a foundation inscription commemorating the reconstruction of the temple of Ningirsu at Girsu. Louvre Museum.

In terms of quantity, the documentation on Gudea is very abundant: in 2000, C. Suter identified 2,445 objects bearing cuneiform inscriptions he commissioned, a corpus that has since grown, particularly following the resumption of excavations at sites of the ancient kingdom of Lagash..

The most numerous type of object by far (more than 2,000) is the clay foundation nail, originally buried under a building whose foundation it commemorates. Next come stamped bricks (more than 200), foundation tablets (around 40), nail-shaped copper foundation figurines, as well as inscriptions on mace heads, stone vases, and statues and stelae. The vast majority (more than 1,800) come from the site of Telloh (the ancient city of Girsu), a few dozen from the two other major sites of the kingdom, Tell Zurghul (Nigin/Nina) and al-Hiba (Lagash), many (more than 500) having an exact provenance unknown because they come from illicit excavations.

These objects mostly include short foundation inscriptions about sanctuaries, others votive inscriptions (accompanying an offering), while those on statues are more elaborate. They are highly stereotyped and, at a minimum, contain the name of the deity to whom the building is dedicated, the name of Gudea as the patron, and the identification of the building. The same inscription is often copied onto numerous objects, including on different materials: there are about a hundred different texts distributed across more than 2,400 objects, some of which differ only in minor ways, such as the addition or removal of one or two lines. The longest text dated to the reign of Gudea is the literary account of the construction of the temple of Ningirsu, an extremely detailed version of the foundation inscriptions, inscribed on two large clay cylinders (Gudea cylinders). This text and the other long inscriptions from the reign of Gudea played an important role in the rediscovery and deciphering of the Sumerian language, notably through the work of François Thureau-Dangin (Inscriptions de Sumer et d'Akkad, 1905) and Adam Falkenstein (Grammatik der Spräche des Gudea von Lagasch, 1949-50).

The diorite statues of Gudea hold a special place in this corpus, due to their importance in the history of art of ancient Mesopotamia. There are at least 21 of them (the authenticity of some or their attribution to the reign of Gudea being debated), accompanied by heads sculpted in the style of the time of Gudea which seem to have been part of statues from this period. These statues often bear inscriptions, some very elaborate. The art of the Gudea period is also represented by copper foundation figurines, depicting the king carrying a brick basket, a crouching deity or an animal, a carved limestone basin, fragmentary lion statues, and several fragmentary bas-reliefs, as well as cylinder seals and cylinder seal impressions (often depicting a scene of presentation/intercession of a human orant before a deity). The constant association of images and texts has prompted the study of the relationships between them, in order to shed light on their meanings and functions, rather than studying them separately.

Administrative (mostly accounting) documentation, usually very important for reconstructing the history of these periods, occupies a marginal place in the study of Gudea's reign. Approximately 600 tablets from the time of his dynasty (22nd century) have been identified. Only a minority include a dating formula that allows it to be attributed to the reign of Gudea, but it is estimated on the basis of the paleography (particularly the form of the cuneiform signs) that most of them date from his reign or that of his son and successor Ur-Ningirsu II.

== Name ==
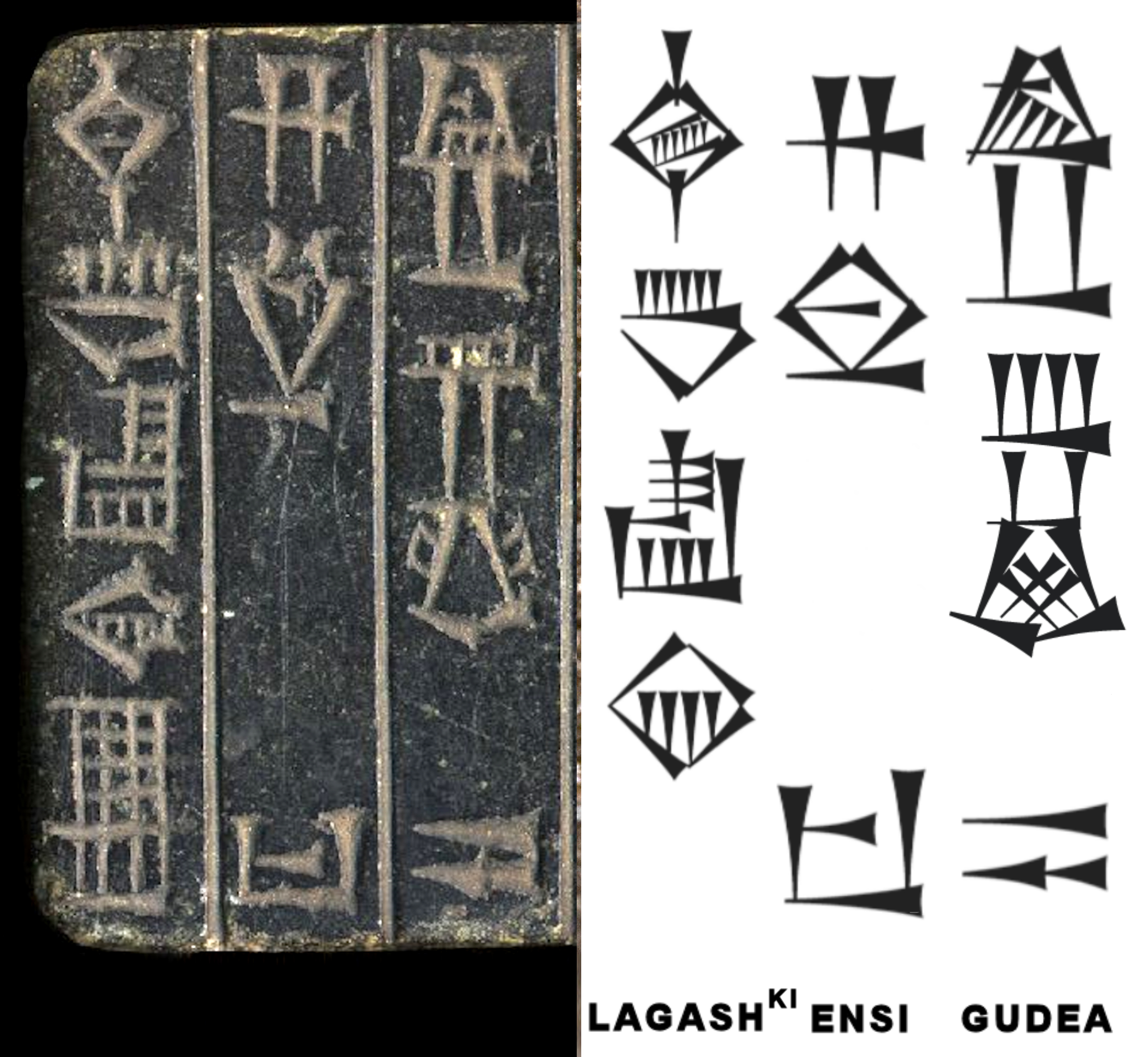
Detail of a foundation tablet, with copy in standardized script: "Gudea, ensí de Lagash" (in the reading direction of the time: from top to bottom in a box and from right to left on the row of boxes).

Gudea is a Sumerian name meaning "the one who is/was called," or, more simply, "The Called One." It is derived from the verb gu_{3}-de_{2} (also transcribed gù-dé), which is itself composed of terms meaning "voice", "cry", "noise" (gu_{3}) and "pour" (de_{2}). Depending on the context, this association of words can be translated as a verb meaning "to address," "to speak to," "to say," or "to shout," as well as "to call," "to summon," or "to choose."

This name could be a "throne name"—that is, a name adopted by a ruler upon their accession to power (therefore not his birth name). In this case, it should be viewed in connection with the importance Gudea placed on the religious dimension of his rule: this expresses the fact that he was nominated by the gods to rule his kingdom.

== Reign ==
=== Chronology, dating ===
The chronology of the period in which Gudea's reign falls remains fraught with several uncertainties which means that only give vague estimates can be given regarding its dating.

- It is impossible to determine the length of his reign or the internal chronology of known events. At least ten year names from his reign are attested, but this number is considered insufficient given the number of construction projects he completed. According to a rough estimate, his reign lasted between 20 and 25 years.
- It is impossible to determine exactly when his reign took place in the 22nd century BC. He became ruler of Lagash in the period between the end of the Akkadian Empire and the rise to power of Ur-Namma of Ur, which marks the beginning of the Third Dynasty of Ur (Ur III). The duration of this "intermediate" period is debated: a century according to P. Steinkeller, about forty years according to W. Hallo, or somewhere in between, 70-80 years according to W. Sallaberger and I. Schrakamp. In any case, Gudea's reign is situated rather towards the end of this period, with perhaps an accession to the throne around 2130 BC and, according to the most widespread opinion following the proposals of P. Steinkeller, an end of reign that more or less overlaps the beginning of the reign of Ur-Namma (around 2110 BC) and the formation of the kingdom of Ur (or else precedes them by a very short time), the (probably peaceful) annexation of Lagash by Ur III occurring under his successors.

=== A ruler of Lagash ===
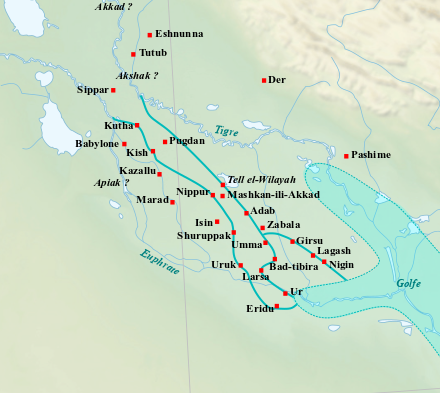
Location of the main sites of southern Mesopotamia during the Akkadian period, preceding the reign of Gudea.

The second dynasty of Lagash (or "Lagash II"), to which Gudea belonged, was founded under uncertain circumstances by a certain Puzur-Mama, during the period of the collapse of the Akkadian Empire. He adopted the title of ensi_{2} or ensik ("ruler," "governor," "steward"), which already designated the rulers of Lagash during the Early Dynastic period (before the Akkadian conquest) and was used during the Akkadian period to designate governors (the title of kings being lugal). His successors, including Gudea, bore the same title. The true founder of this new kingdom of Lagash was Ur-Ningirsu, a contemporary of the last kings of Akkad. He was succeeded by an undetermined number of rulers, known primarily from foundation inscriptions. This is not a dynasty in the strict sense, since they are probably not all related. Their inscriptions rarely mention their lineage, and it appears that power was sometimes transferred through a marriage alliance with the royal family. That was the case for Gudea: he was the son-in-law of his predecessor Ur-Bau, after his marriage to his daughter Ninalla. We know of another wife of Gudea, Nininmgina, who may have succeeded the previous one (assuming he was monogamous).

Gudea reigned as an independent ruler over Lagash and its surrounding region, a territory whose exact size remains uncertain, extending southeast of Sumer, south of the city of Umma, and as far as the Persian Gulf, bordering to the east the lands of the Elamite sphere and to the west other Sumerian cities (Larsa, Uruk, and Ur being the most notable). In addition to its eponymous city, Lagash (the modern site of al-Hiba), the kingdom of Lagash included another major city, Girsu (Telloh), to the north, seat of the great local god Ningirsu, which may have served as its true "capital," and is certainly the source of most of the documentation relating to the period of Lagash II. South of Lagash lay another important city, Nigin (or Nina, the site of Zurghul). The southernmost part of the kingdom, on the coast of the Persian Gulf, includes the region's main port, Gu'abba (the "Sea shore"; exact location unknown). It was a wealthy region thanks to its agricultural and maritime resources, as well as its position on important trade routes. During the Akkadian period, it was one of the empire's most important provinces, and this remained true under the Third Dynasty of Ur. Although little is known about the economic situation during Gudea's reign, it is likely that he ruled over a prosperous kingdom.

The administrative documentation from the Lagash II period, which dates primarily from the reigns of Gudea and his son and successor Ur-Ningirsu II, is predominantly administrative in nature. As is often the case for early periods of Mesopotamian history, it mainly documents the circulation of goods, particularly expenditures (zi-ga), and personnel management, offering glimpses into some of the key figures playing important roles in the administration of the time. According to M. Maiocchi and G. Visicato, "the emerging picture shows a highly centralized urban system, revolving around the local ruler and the institutions under his authority. The dense network of administrative configurations emerging within the royal family and its entourage (ministers, cup-bearers, scribes, 'captains', supervisors, administrators, etc.) argues for a mature system, similar to the Sargonic and Ur III administrations."

=== Geopolitical context and sphere of influence ===
Location of the main sites and regions of the eastern part of the Middle East in the second part of the 3rd millennium BC.

The end of Akkadian rule, at the end of Shar-kali-sharri's reign (ca. 2193 BC), led to the political fragmentation of southern Mesopotamia. The main beneficiaries of this collapse, and perhaps its main instigators, were the Gutians, a people originating from the Zagros Mountains, who settled in the northern part of Lower Mesopotamia, between Sippar and Adab, the latter serving as their capital. This period is sometimes referred to as the "Gutian interlude." The southern part of the region, the land of Sumer, largely remained outside their control. Lagash dominated at least its eastern fringe, while the western part seems to have been organized around Uruk. It was a ruler from the latter, Utu-hegal, who defeated the Gutians. Another important king emerging from the ruins of the Akkadian empire was Puzur-Inshushinak, who dominated the entire Elamite territory east of Lagash, from the city of Susa. For a time, he managed to control the Diyala River Valley and central Mesopotamia. Finally, these regions were unified by a king from Ur, named Ur-Namma (ca. 2112-2095 BC), who was perhaps a brother of Utu-hegal. He is the founder of the Ur III dynasty.

Where does Gudea's reign fit into this context? He makes virtually no reference to neighboring kingdoms in his inscriptions, and mentions only one campaign, in the inscription on his Statue B: "He conquered the cities of Anshan and Elam and brought the spoils from the latter to Ningirsu in his (temple) E-ninnu." His reign was therefore not a peaceful one, and it would have been surprising if it had been otherwise, given the political context. An inscription of Gudea unearthed at Shushtar in Susiana seems to confirm that he dominated at least part of this region. But the context of this campaign is unknown. According to what is known of the history of the period, his target would have been Puzur-Inshushinak. According to P. Steinkeller and G. Marchesi, Gudea's armies accompanied those of Ur-Namma as he defeated this adversary, while W. Sallaberger and I. Schrakamp consider that Gudea conquered the region before Ur-Namma. F. Pomponio dates Gudea's reign to an even earlier date, prior to the victories of Utu-hegal, who would then be the contemporary of Gudea's successor, Ur-Ningirsu II.

In any case, the fact that Gudea was able to make offerings at Nippur, and probably install some of his statues at Ur and Uruk, in addition to the work he undertook at Shushtar, indicates that his influence extended beyond the borders of his kingdom. At any rate, relations between Lagash and Uruk and Ur are considered to have been peaceful during Gudea's reign. He was also able to trade with the elamite sphere and the countries involved in the Gulf trade (Dilmun, Magan, Meluhha) to obtain raw materials necessary for his pious works. Materials for his buildings and statues were brought from all parts of western Asia: cedar wood from the Amanus mountains, quarried stones from Lebanon, copper from northern Arabia, gold and precious stones from the desert between Canaan and Egypt, diorite from Magan (Oman), and timber from Dilmun (Bahrain).

== Gudea and the gods of Lagash ==
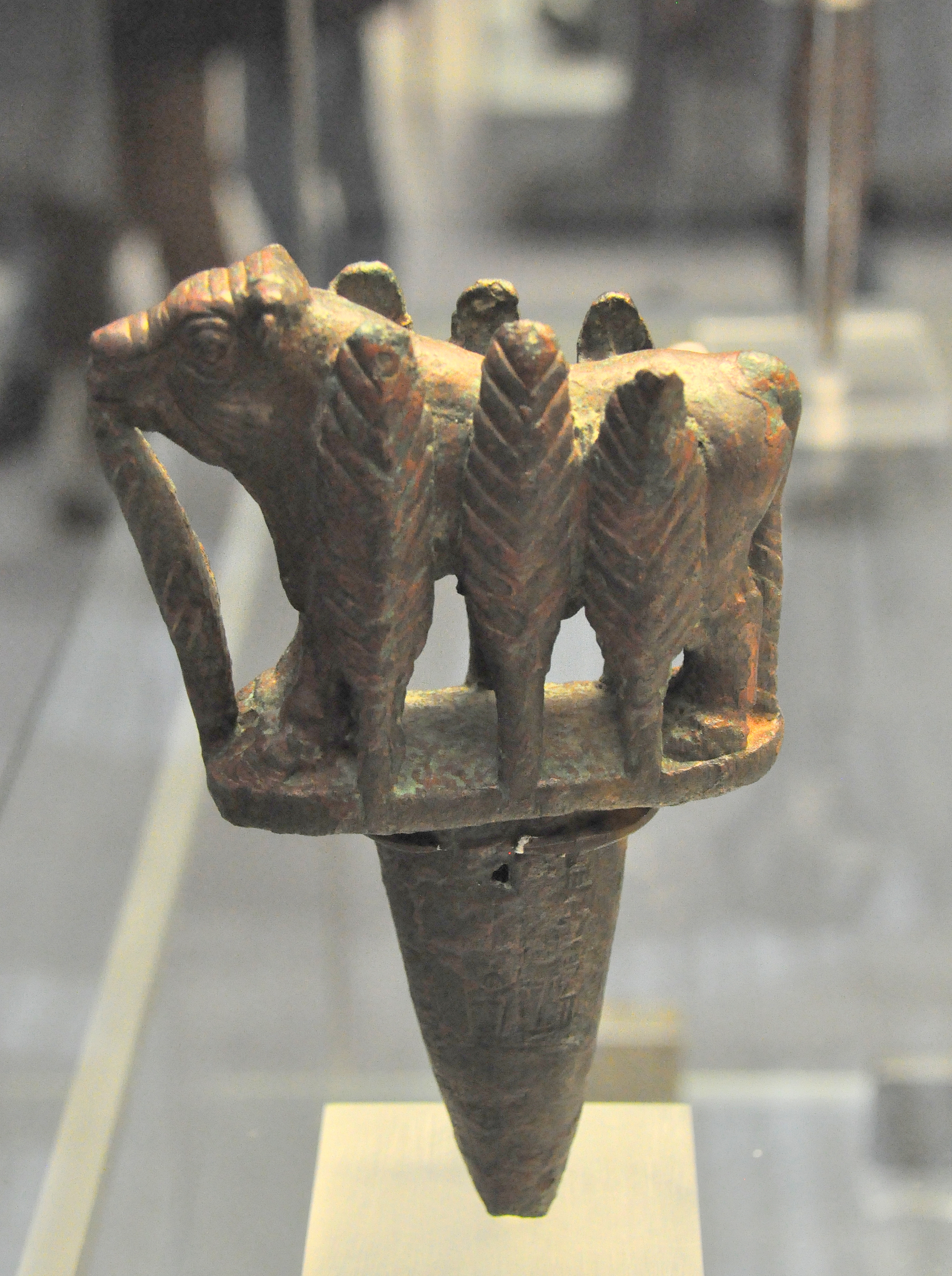
Foundation peg surmounted by a figurine of a calf in reed marsh, commemorating the restoration by Gudea of the temple of the goddess Nanshe. British Museum.

Gudea presents himself in his inscriptions first and foremost as a pious king. He undertook numerous projects aimed at developing the cult of the gods of his kingdom, from daily offerings to the construction of their sanctuaries. The majority of sources from his reign commemorate this activity and emphasize the king's connection to the divine realm. The pantheon of the kingdom of Lagash has a very distinct local character: it is dominated by his tutelary god, Ningirsu, and members of his family, notably his wife Bau (or Baba), their son Shulshaga, his sister Nanshe, and the goddess Gatumdug, while also incorporating deities common to other Sumerian countries, notably Inanna and Nisaba. Gudea fits into this context, while also introducing some modifications, probably related to his desire to consolidate his power. Ningirsu remained the primordial god, receiving the most attention. The cult of his wife Bau was also supported. He claimed two divine mothers: the local goddess Gatumdug, and also the goddess Ninsun, from Uruk (where she was considered the mother of the hero-king Gilgamesh). The other major goddess of Lagash, Nanshe, was presented as close to the king. The most notable innovation was the elevation of Ningishzida, previously little venerated in Lagash, to become Gudea's personal god, alongside the goddess Geshtinanna, who was then considered his wife. Through the kinship relationships of these different deities, Gudea is also linked to two major figures of the Sumerian pantheon: the king of the gods Enlil, father of Ningirsu, and the wise god Enki, father (or brother) of Nanshe. These connections are highlighted, for example, in the inscription on Statue D:

Gudea, the ruler of Lagash, The one of eternal name, The one who tows Enlil’s barge, Shepherd whom Ningirsu chose in his heart, Strong steward of Nanshe, The man to whom Bau keeps her word, The child to whom Gatumdu gave birth, To whom Igalim gave authority and a supreme scepter, Whom Shulshaga abundantly provided with breath of life, The straightforward man whom his city loves.

=== The Pious King ===
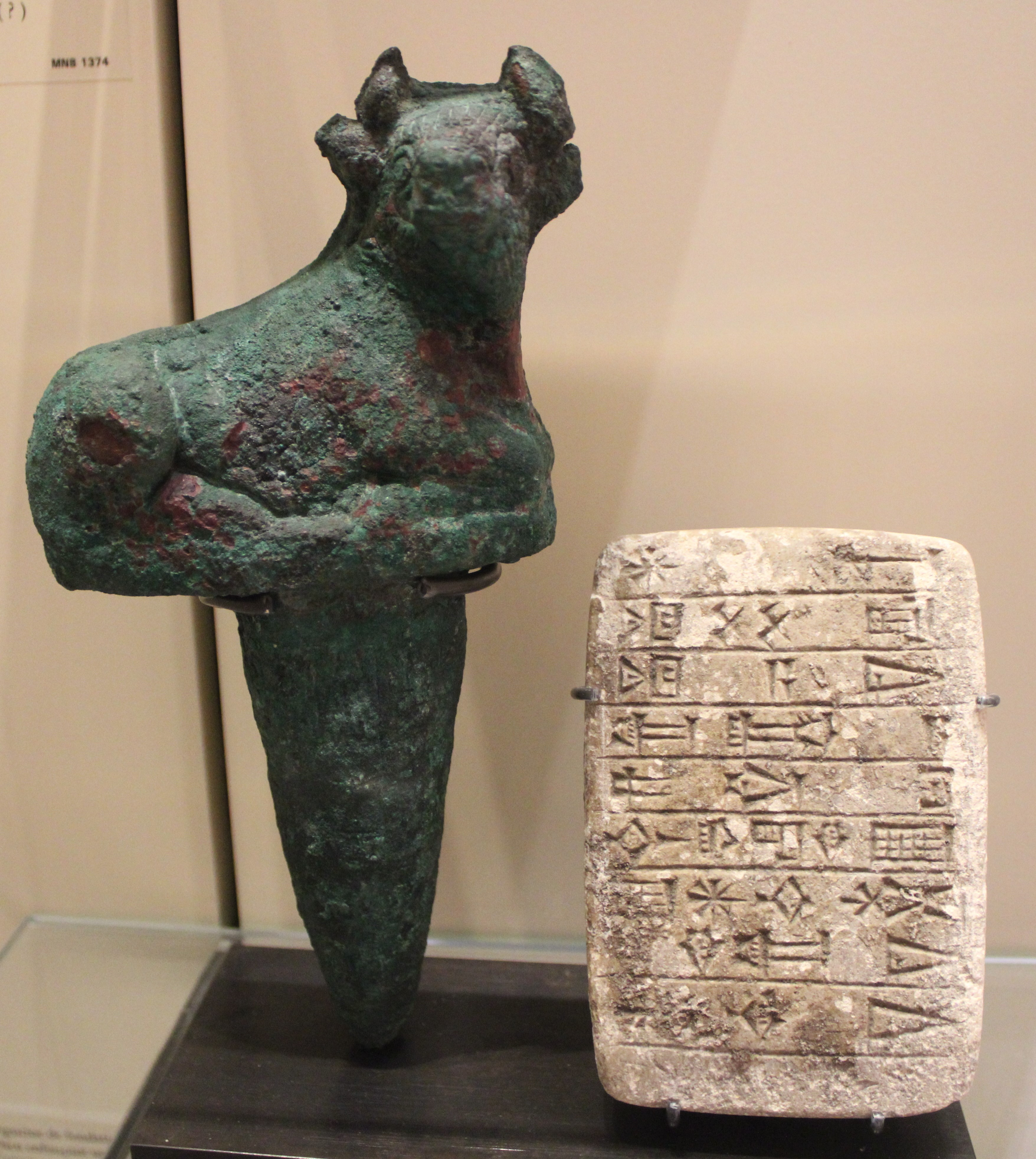
Copper alloy foundation nail surmounted by a recumbent bull, with a limestone tablet bearing an inscription commemorating the construction of the temple of Inanna at Girsu. Louvre Museum.

Although his reign was not devoid of military events, Gudea almost only commemorated his pious deeds. With the exception of the first one, which evokes his ascension to the throne, his year names, chosen to recall the most significant event of the preceding year, commemorate temple rebuildings, offerings to the gods, and the consecration of a high priestess. His statues and other inscribed documents do the same, with the exception of the mention of his campaign in Elam on Statue B.

Gudea thus sought to present himself as a servant of the gods, embodying the ideal of the pious king as enshrined in Sumerian royal tradition. He thereby turned his back on the warlike tendencies of the Akkadian kings and other rulers of his time who emphasized their military conquests. His reign has often been seen by historians as the beginning of a "Sumerian renaissance," giving impetus to the cultural flourishing of the Third Dynasty of Ur.

It is indeed tempting to see in this king's actions a desire to reject the Akkadian heritage in favor of turning to that of the Sumerian dynasties that the Akkadian kings had subjugated, including the ancient kings of Lagash. This would also explain the archaic aspects of his votive inscriptions, which reiterate formulations used in the period preceding the Akkadian conquest, as well as the return to the practice of foundation figurines, which had been abandoned during the Akkadian period. In art, he is depicted as a pious, static king, rejecting the dynamic and vigorous image of the ever-victorious kings of Akkad.

He also conformed to the image of the builder king, commemorating the reconstruction of the Ningirsu sanctuary with a lengthy text known from his Cylinders A and B, and having himself depicted as an architect on his Statues B and F. His known inscriptions indicate that he honored at least 21 deities and undertook work in 24 sanctuaries.

He is also sometimes referred to as the "shepherd" (sipa), a metaphor typical of Sumerian royal ideology, used to designate a ruler who knows how to properly guide and protect his subjects, under a pacifying order.

His inscriptions evoke his privileged relationships with deities belonging to the Lagash pantheon (he makes very little reference to the gods of other parts of Sumer). In particular, he is the chosen one of the kingdom's great god, Ningirsu, to whom he devotes the most effort; he places himself under the protection of Ningishzida, his personal god; and he claims to be the son of the goddess Gatumdug, who supposedly gave birth to him in her sanctuary. His divine lineage is clearly figurative and metaphorical, and probably does not refer to the objective of conferring divine status upon the him. There is no clear indication that he was deified and received a cult during his lifetime. The qualities he emphasizes in texts and images certainly do not make him a divine figure, but they do confer upon him a "superhuman" status, enabling him to be in close contact with the gods.

In addition to the artistic flourishing that occurred during his reign, Sumerian literature was likely promoted by this king: he commissioned the composition of the long hymn contained in Cylinders A and B, and perhaps also two other poems, one dedicated to Bau and the other to Nanshe, known from later copies but which mention his name. It has also been suggested that hymns dedicated to the figure of Ninurta (identified with Ningirsu) were composed during his reign, but this is more doubtful. The court literature of Gudea's time seems to have inspired that of Shulgi of Ur's reign, who may have employed scribes who served Gudea.

=== The statues of Gudea ===
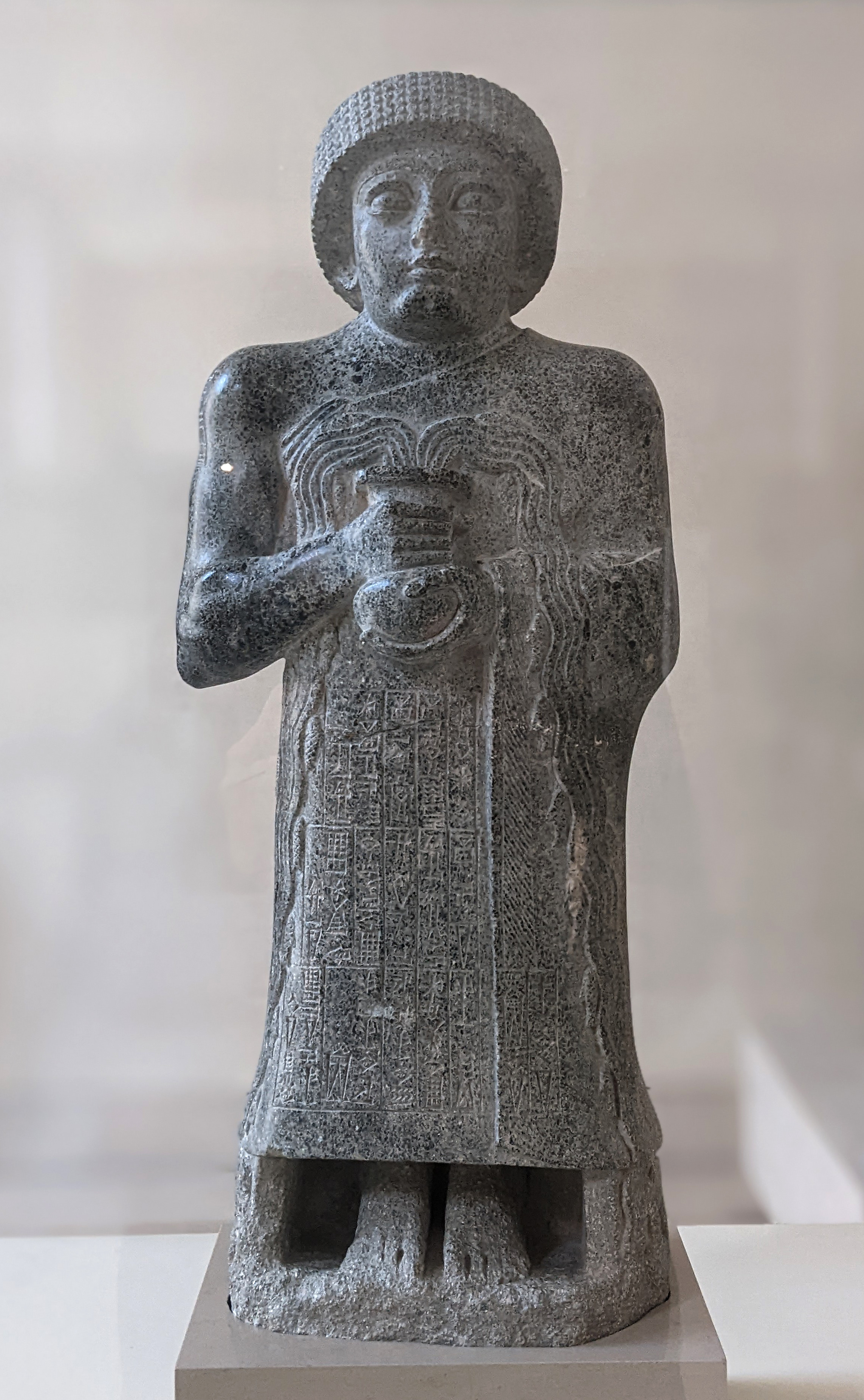
Statue N, or "statue with the gushing vase," commemorating the construction of the temple of the goddess Geshtinanna. Louvre Museum. Unearthed during the illegal excavations of Tell V at Tello in 1924, it was acquired by a Parisian antiquarian and then sold to the Louvre in 1967.

Gudea owes its renown in the field of ancient history and art primarily to his statues, most of which are carved from diorite, a hard, black stone imported from southern Arabia (ancient Magan). These are often partially damaged or destroyed (many are headless), with only a few being complete or nearly so. The earliest known statues were found at the site of Telloh, the ancient Girsu, during the first French excavation campaigns, which took place between 1878 and 1909. Others have been discovered by archaeologists at other sites (Nippur, Tell Hammam). Many have an unknown or even dubious provenance, as they come from clandestine excavations and were acquired by museums through the antiquities market. Consequently, the number of known statues of Gudea is debated: some may be forgeries created in modern times, others attributable to another ruler, while fragments of inscriptions may have belonged to destroyed statues. According to specialists, the corpus ranges between 24 and 27 statues. In modern times, they were assigned identification letters (A, B, C, etc.).

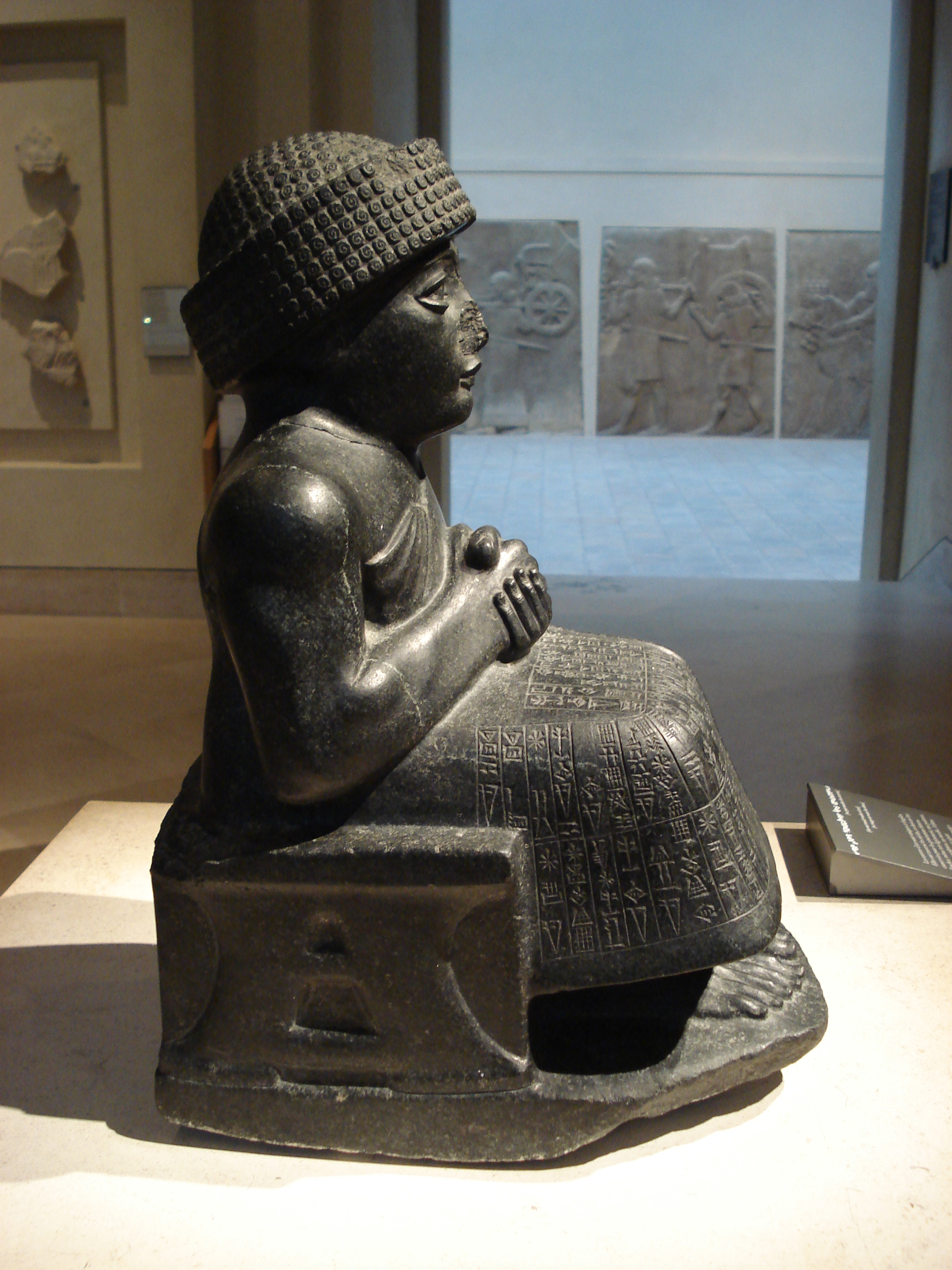
Statue H of Gudea, represented seated, dedicated to the god Ningishzida. Louvre Museum.

The king is depicted dressed in the manner typical of kings of the period: with a long, fringed tunic, open at the right shoulder, and, when preserved, his head is generally covered with a wide-brimmed cap. He is standing in at least 10 cases, or seated, in at least 7 cases. I. Winter highlighted various physical characteristics of the king that manifest the different qualities the gods bestowed upon him to make him fit to reign: the statues have a massive aspect, a thickness and proportions that seem to manifest the king's remarkable character, his charisma; the "broad" body and chest refer to the king's vitality; the muscular body (especially the arms) is a guarantee of vigor and strength, and therefore of the king's "heroic" character; the large ears indicate that Gudea is listening to divine commands, a sign of wisdom; the king's gaze is turned towards the deities, since at least some of his statues being placed in shrines opposite divine statues, the king being ready to receive their orders while showing them his devotion.

The inscriptions also provide details about the functions of these statues. They indicate at least the god to whom they were dedicated and the circumstances of their consecration. They vary greatly in length, the shortest being that of Statue Q, which contains only the basic elements: the recipient god, the identification of the dedicator (Gudea), the circumstances of the offering, the name of the statue, and its location.

For Ningishzida, his (personal) god, did Gudea, ruler of Lagash, who built Ningirsu's Eninnu, fashion a statue of himself. "It befits the House" - (this is how) he named (the statue) for his sake, and he brought it to him into his house.

The more extensive inscriptions, especially that of Statue B which is the longest, contain further details on the construction of temples and the making of statues, the ritual offerings accompanying their consecration, and even curses against those who would harm the object and therefore the memory of Gudea.

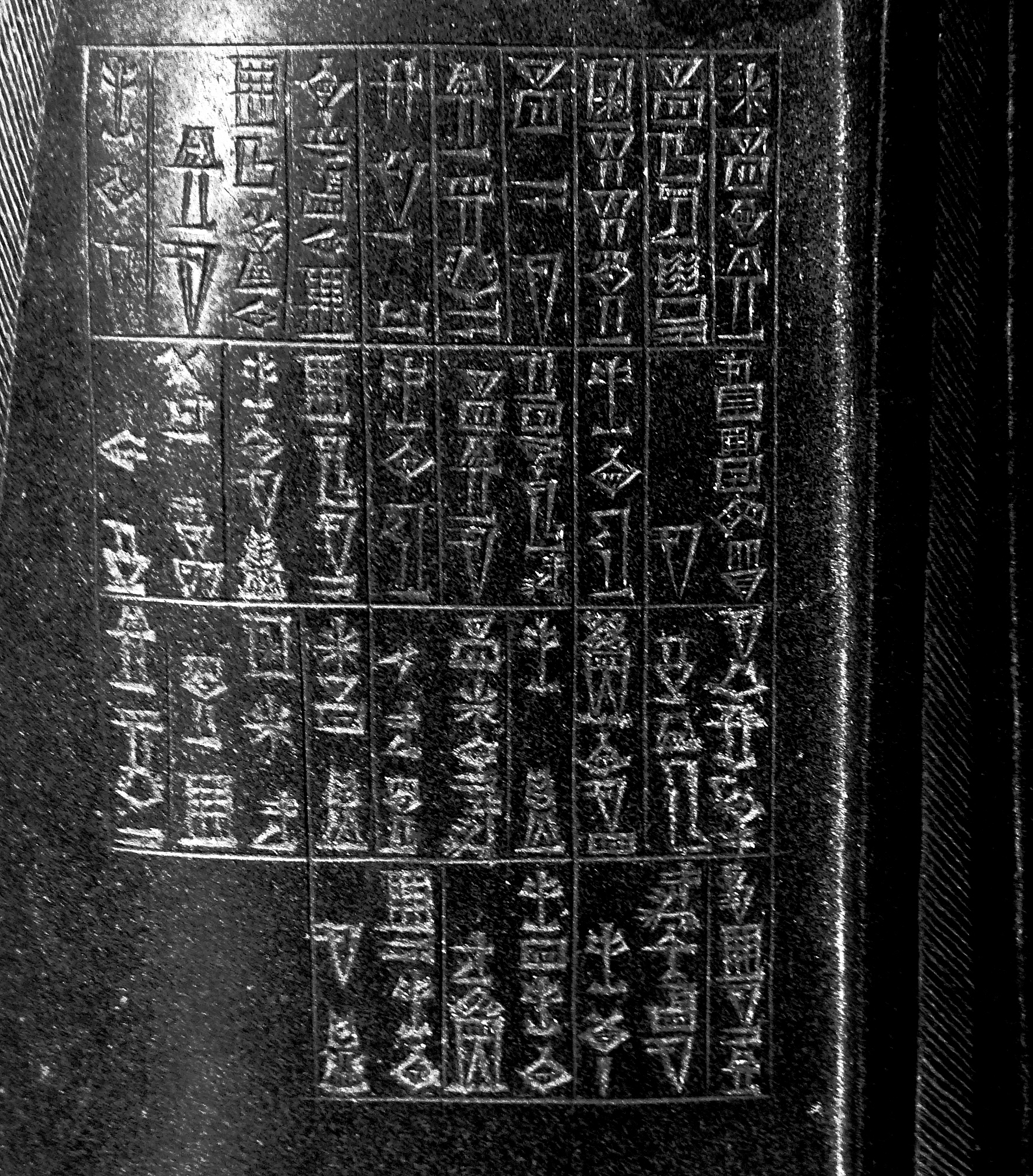
Inscription of statue A. Louvre Museum.

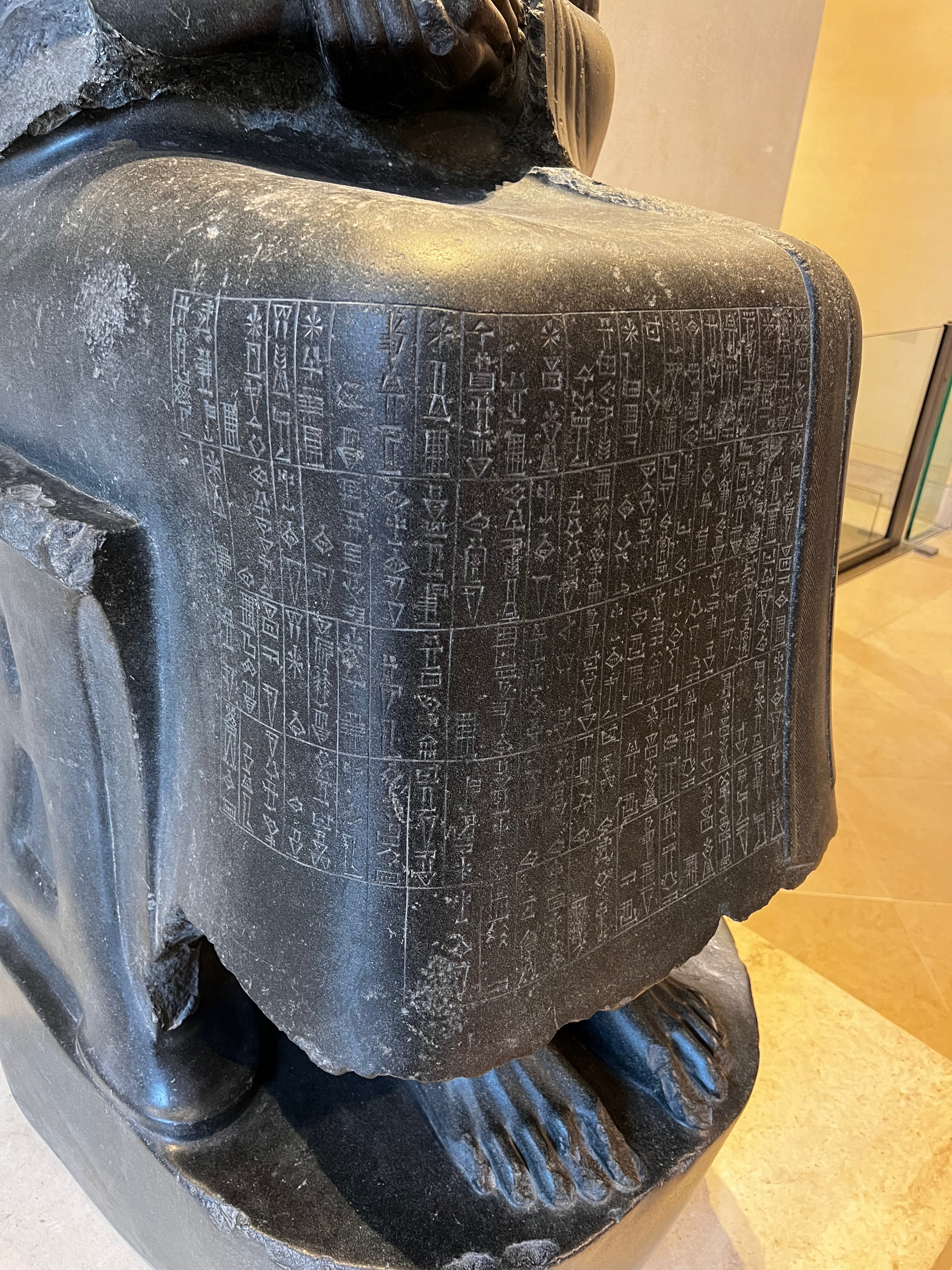
Inscription of statue D. Louvre Museum.

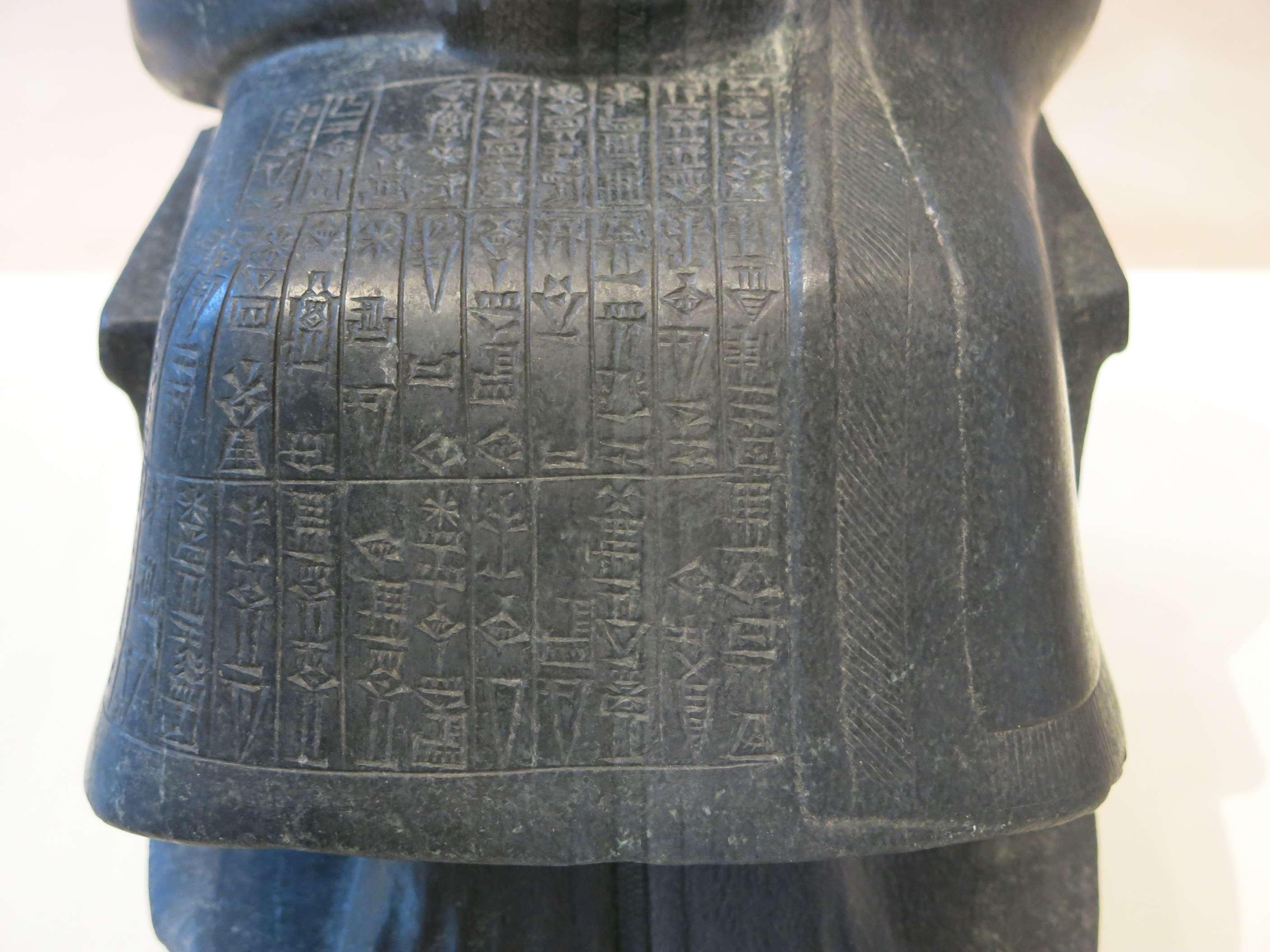
Inscription of the statue I. Louvre Museum.

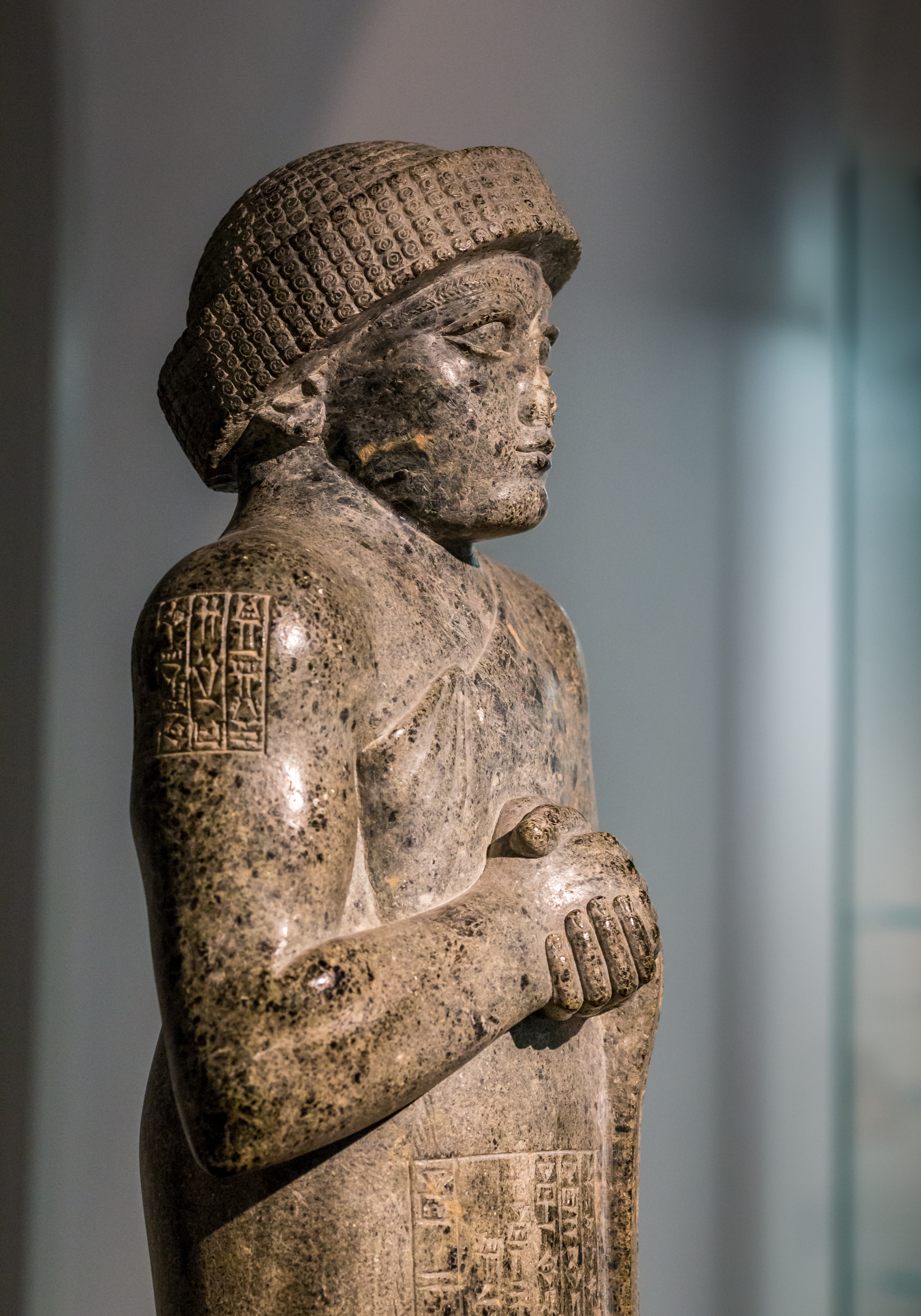
Statue O; the name of the king is inscribed on his shoulder, the main inscription on his tunic. Ny Carlsberg Glyptotek.

The statues were intended to be placed in temples and served to invoke the blessings of the gods upon the king, particularly that they grant him a long life. Through a ritual of consecration and naming, they were brought to life and served to prolong the life of the individual they represented. Placing a statue of a person near that of a god was a way to ensure that the person would pay perpetual homage, through prayers and participation in offering rituals. They also served to preserve his memory. However, it is not certain that they themselves were the object of worship during Gudea's lifetime, even if they served in his cult after his death.

=== Other votive objects ===
Various other sculpted votive objects from the reign of Gudea have been unearthed, testifying to the emphasis placed on his links with the deities of Lagash and the richness of the art of his kingdom.

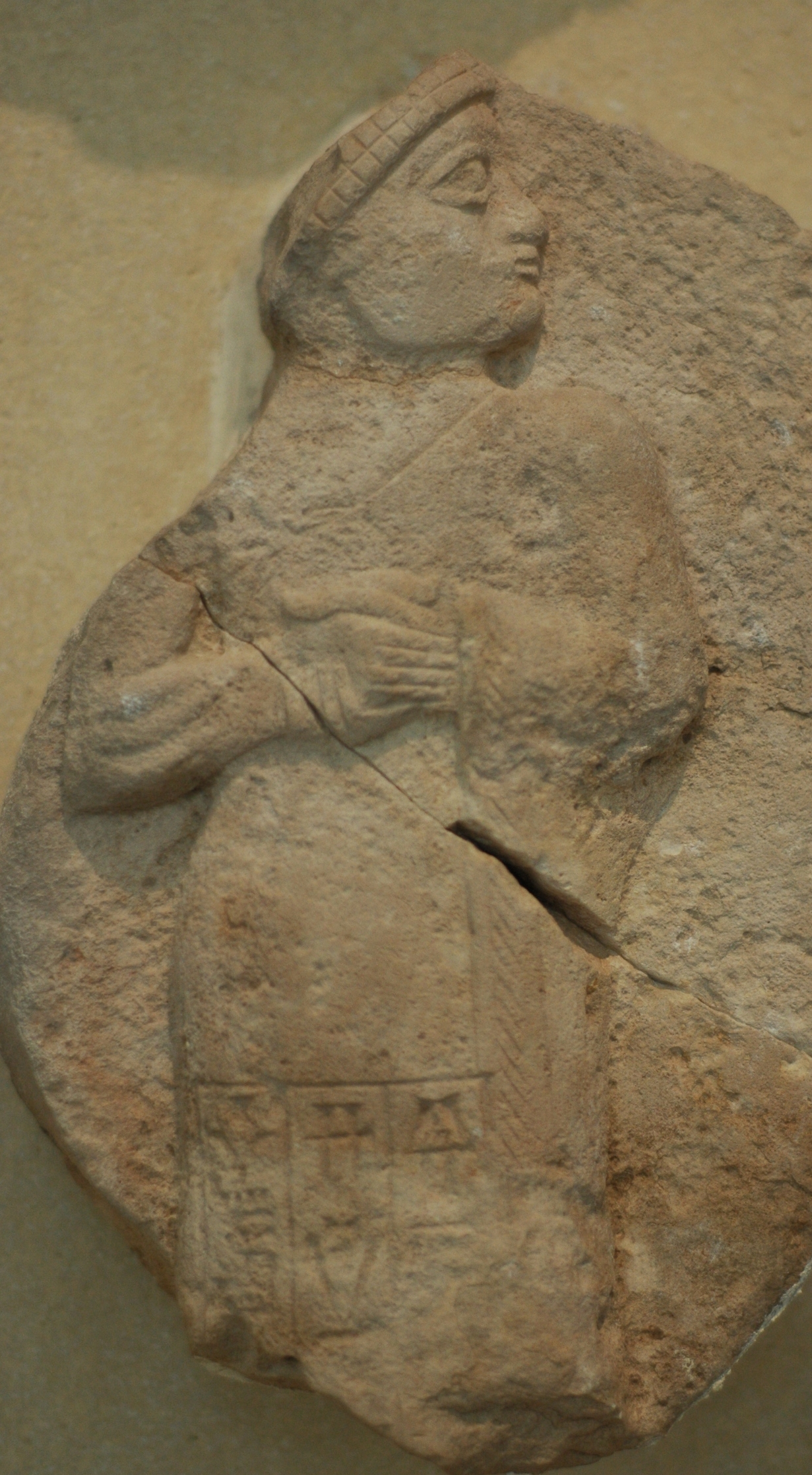
Fragment of limestone stele representing Gudea. Louvre Museum.

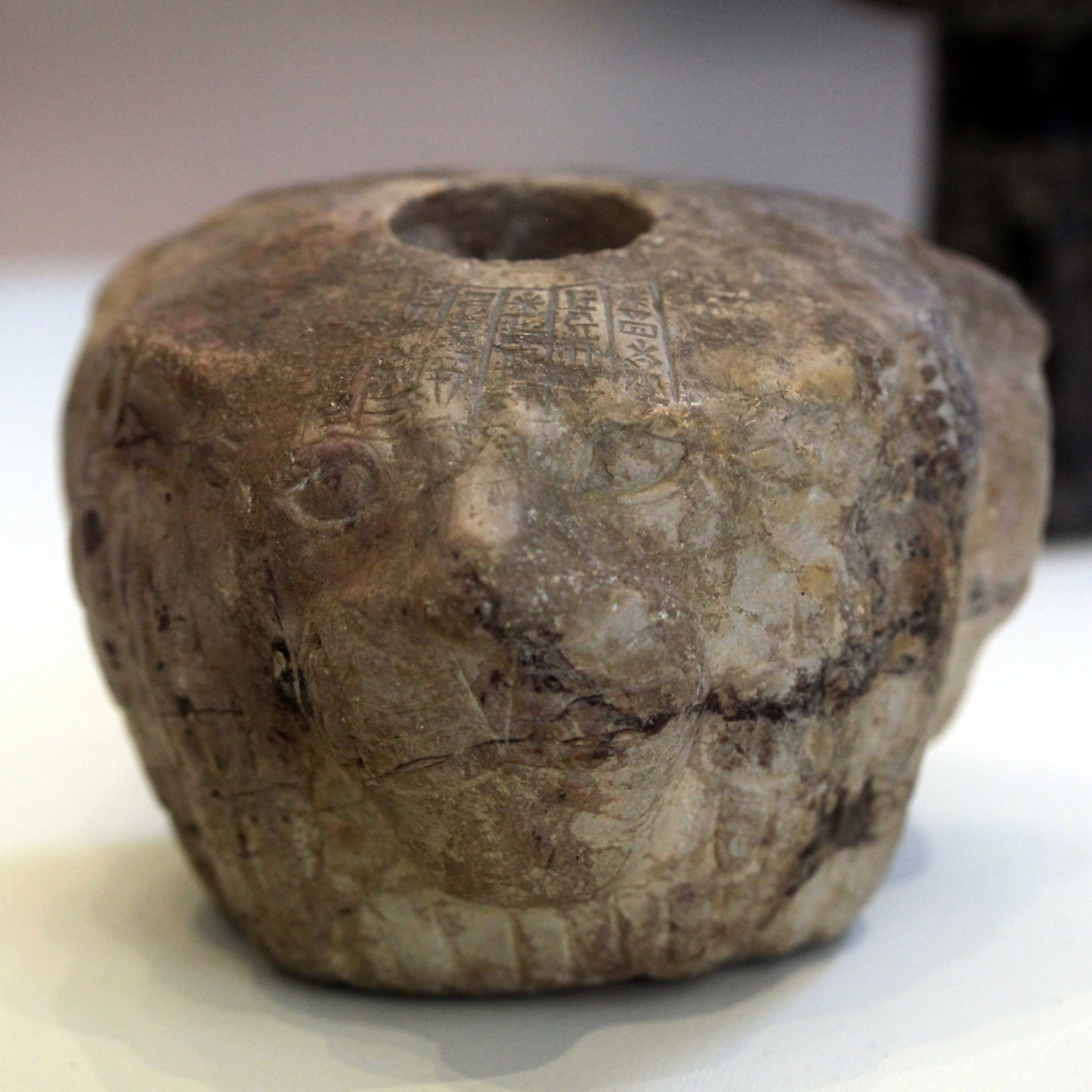
Votive mace with lion's head. Louvre Museum.

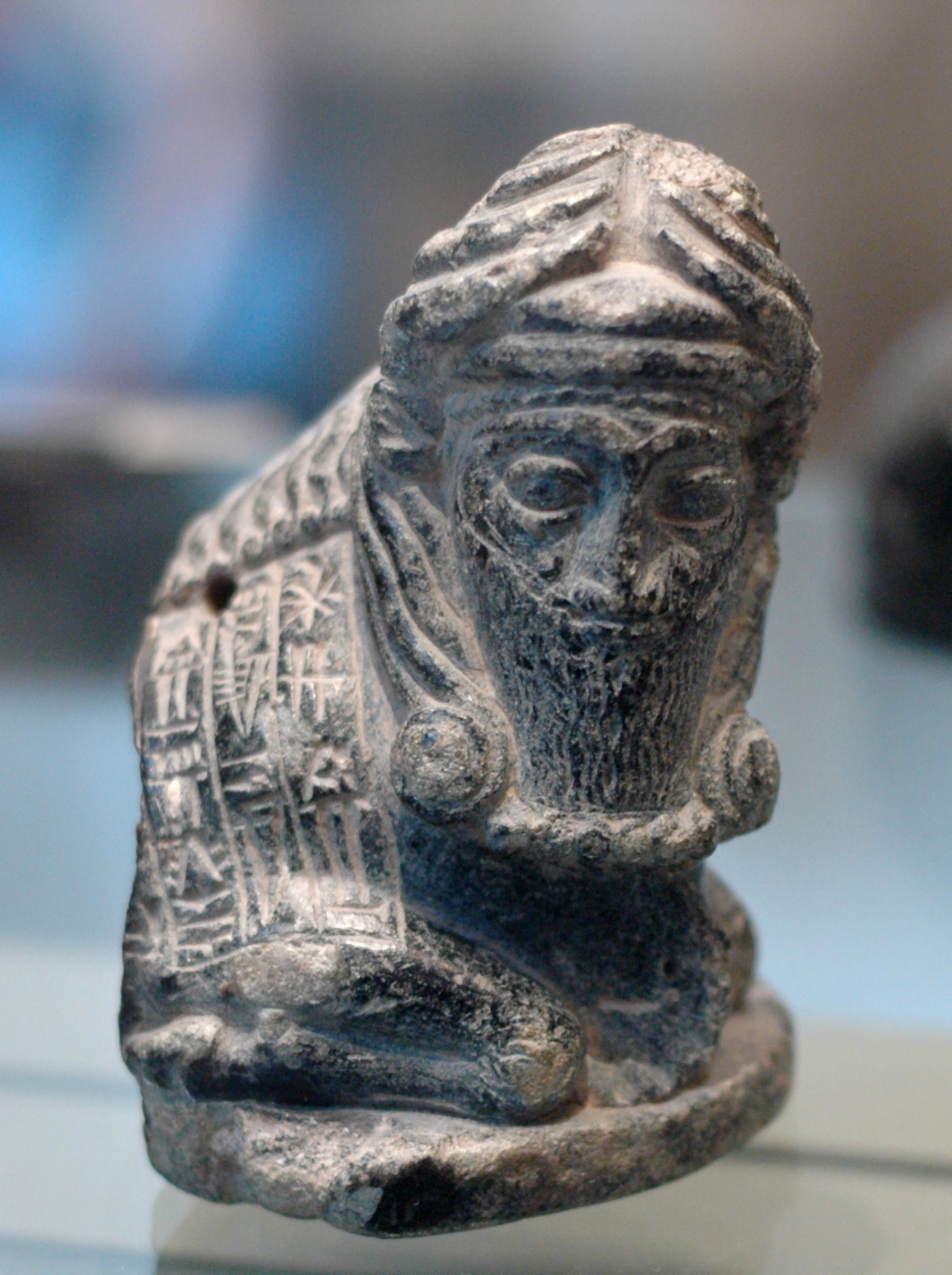
Fragment of a chlorite statuette of a human-headed bull. Louvre Museum.

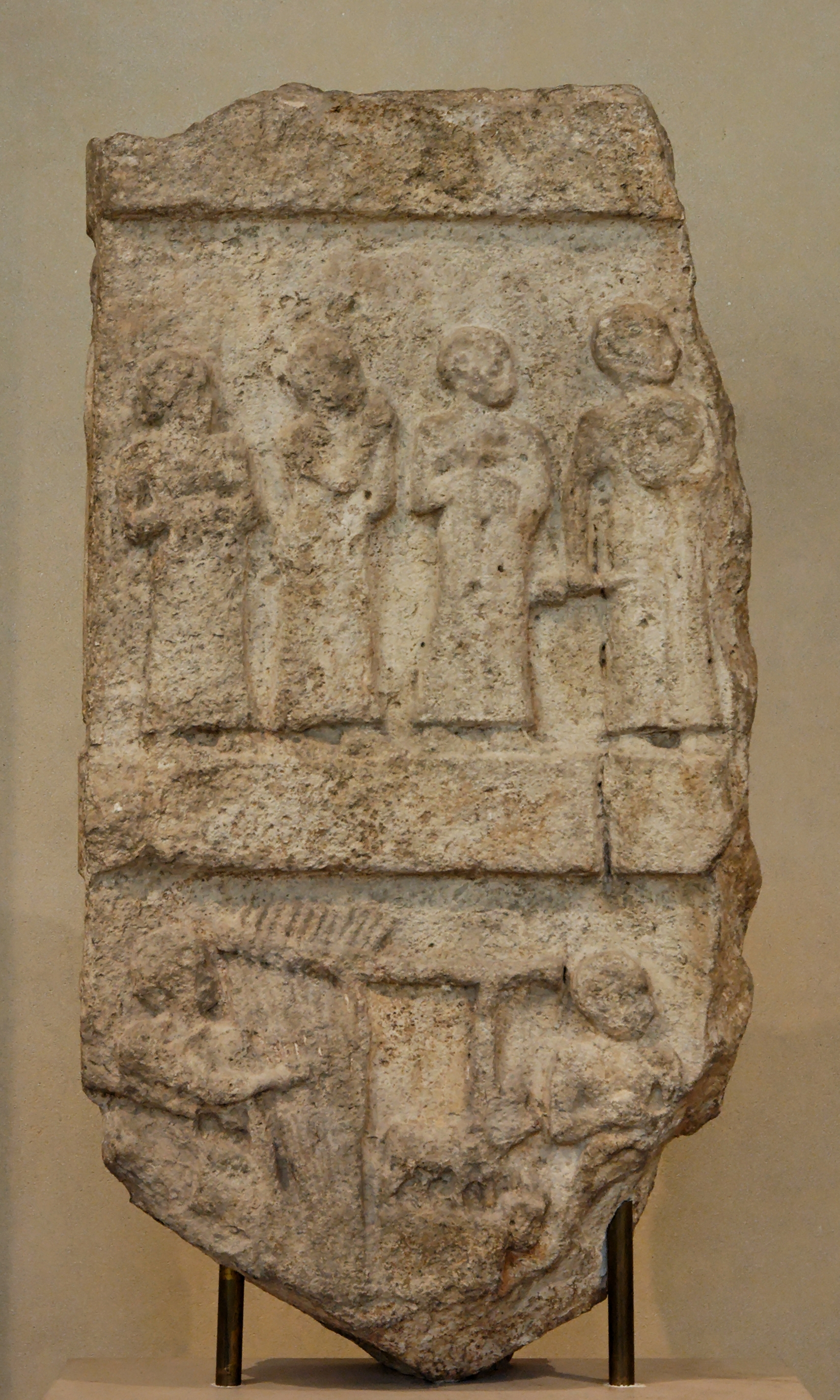
Fragment of a limestone stele depicting a procession of priests and musicians. Louvre Museum.

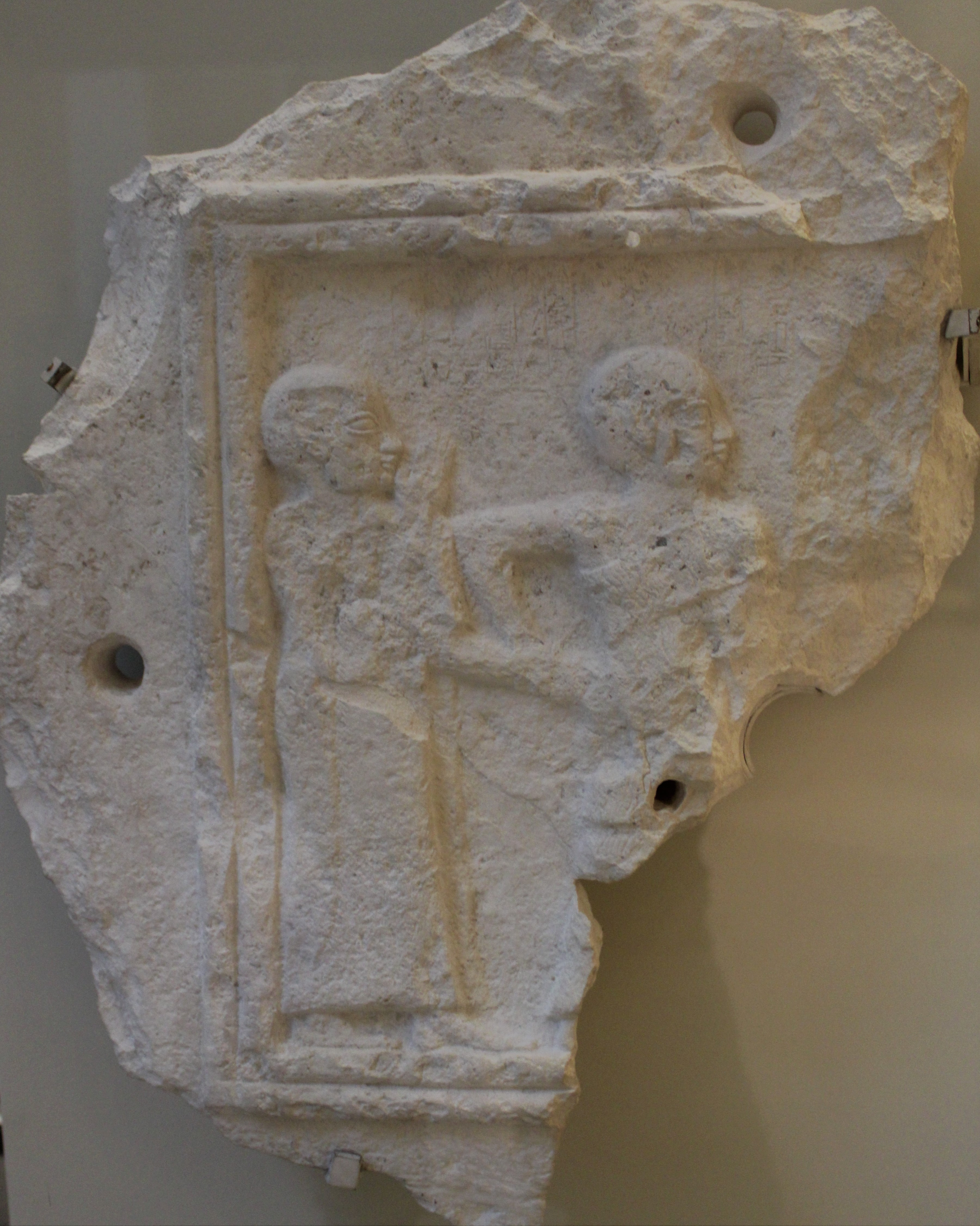
Fragmentary stele depicting a presentation scene with Gudea, led by Ningishzida. Louvre Museum.

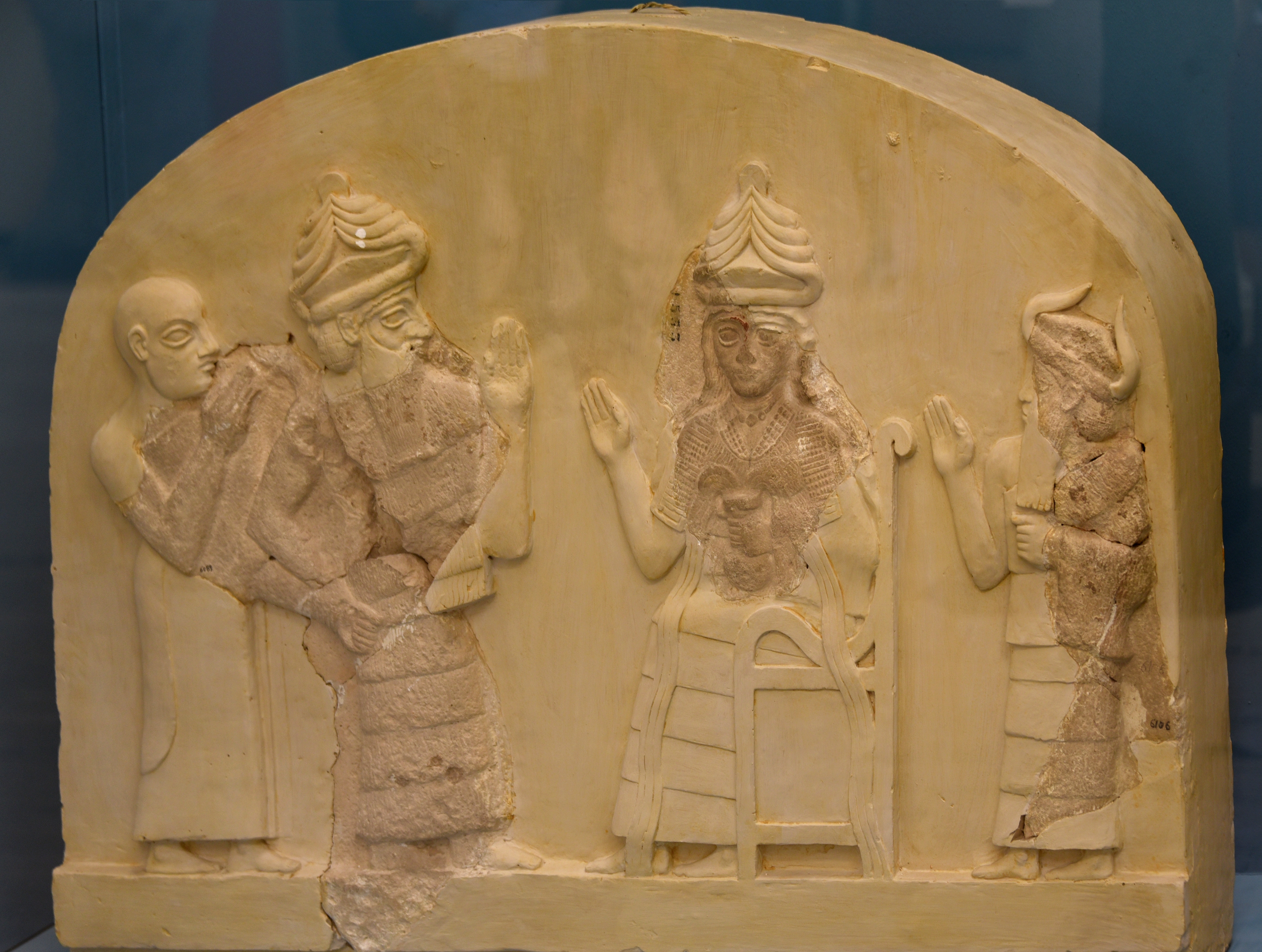
Fragmentary stele (with reconstructions) depicting a scene of Gudea being presented by Ningishzida before a goddess seated on a throne. Istanbul Museum of the Ancient Orient.

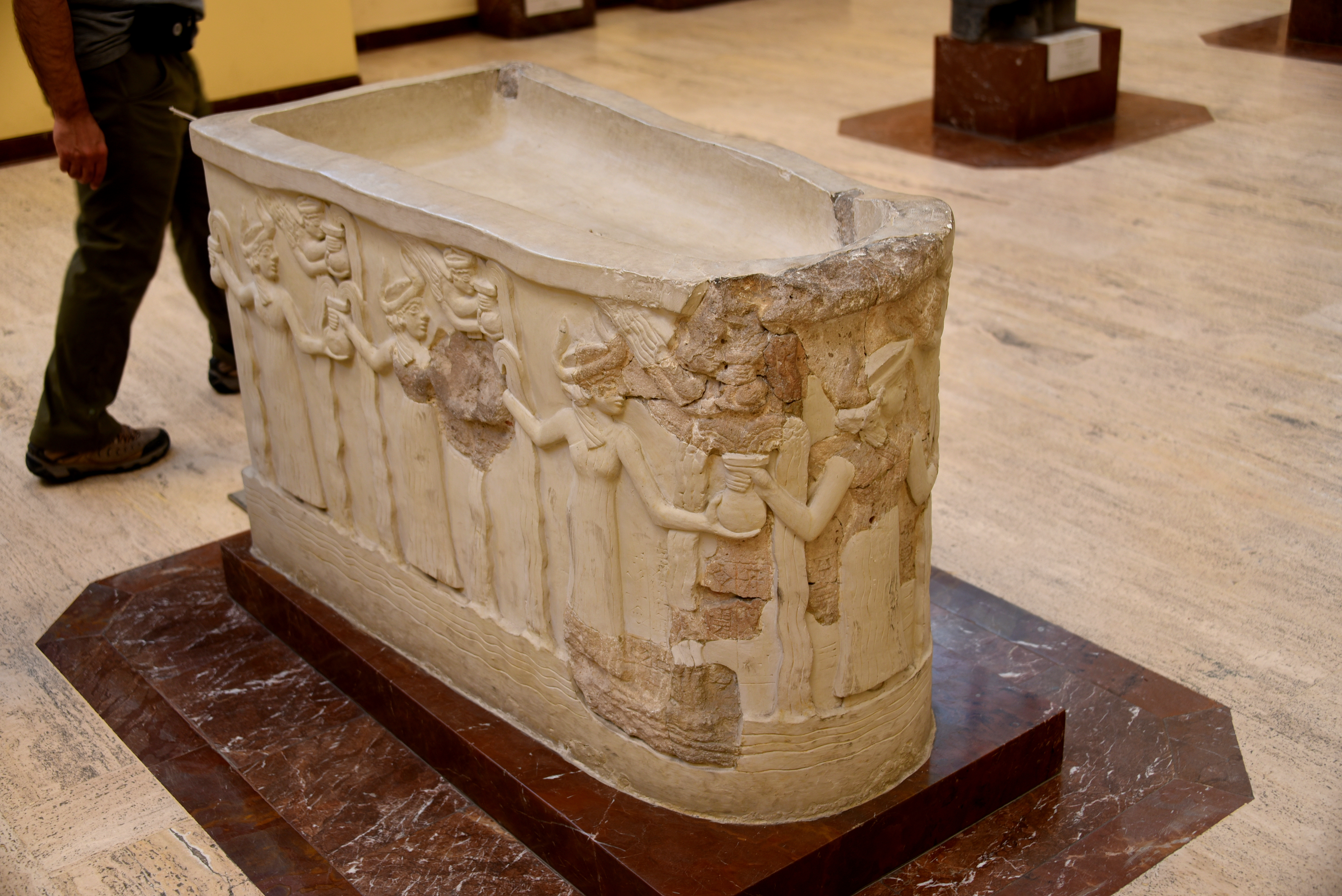
Fragmentary cult basin dedicated by Gudea to Ningirsu. Museum of the Ancient Orient, Istanbul.

=== The Temple of Ningirsu ===
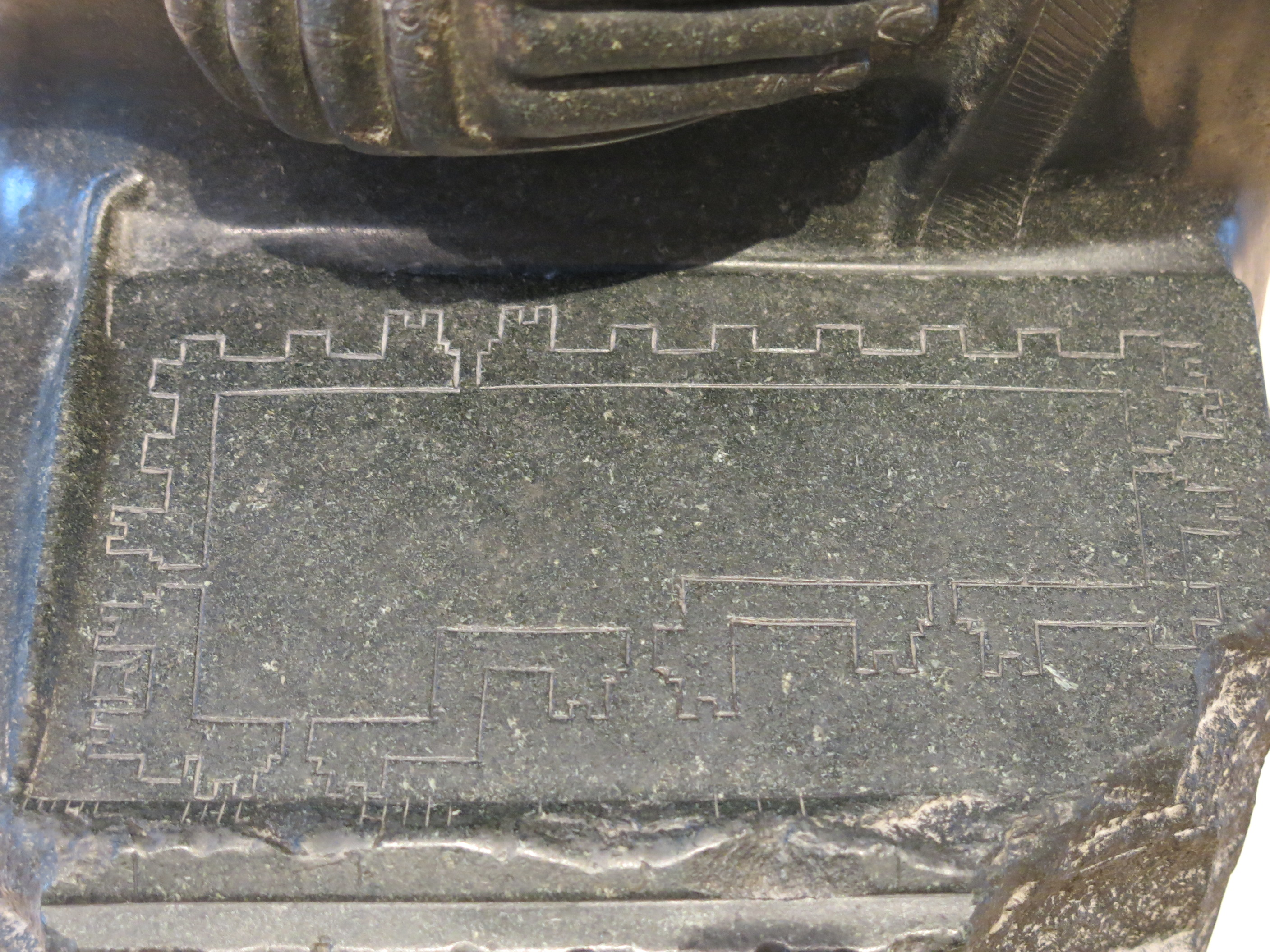
The plan of the temple of Ningirsu on the lap of Statue B. Louvre Museum.

The principal god of the land of Lagash was Ningirsu, whose name in Sumerian means "Lord of Girsu." He was considered the son of Enlil, and as such, he was often associated with Ninurta, also a son of Enlil, whose cult was more widespread outside of Lagash. He was both a warrior god and an agricultural god. As his name indicates, his main sanctuary was located in Girsu, although he had temples in other locations within the kingdom, notably in Lagash city (Ebagara, which Gudea also restored). His temple of Girsu is the E-ninnu, ""House of Fifty (White Anzû-Birds"), which in Gudea's time is also referred to by the epithet "White Anzû," in reference to a mythical bird commonly associated with Ningirsu (also sometimes translated as "Thunderbird" in reference to the creature from North American indigenous peoples' mythology).

This temple was located on Tell A at the Telloh site, where some of its constituent structures were identified during excavations. The director of the most recent excavations at the site, S. Rey, considers it to be a "New Eninnu" built by Gudea, the god's earlier main sanctuary being located elsewhere on the site (on Tell K). Few remains of the temple have been unearthed, but its appearance can be reconstructed from sources left by Gudea, the construction narratives and the plan depicted on Statue B, which shows the building's exterior walls. This large enclosure included buttresses, monumental gates, a decoration of pilasters and redans, and probably opened onto several courtyards leading to the cultic rooms.

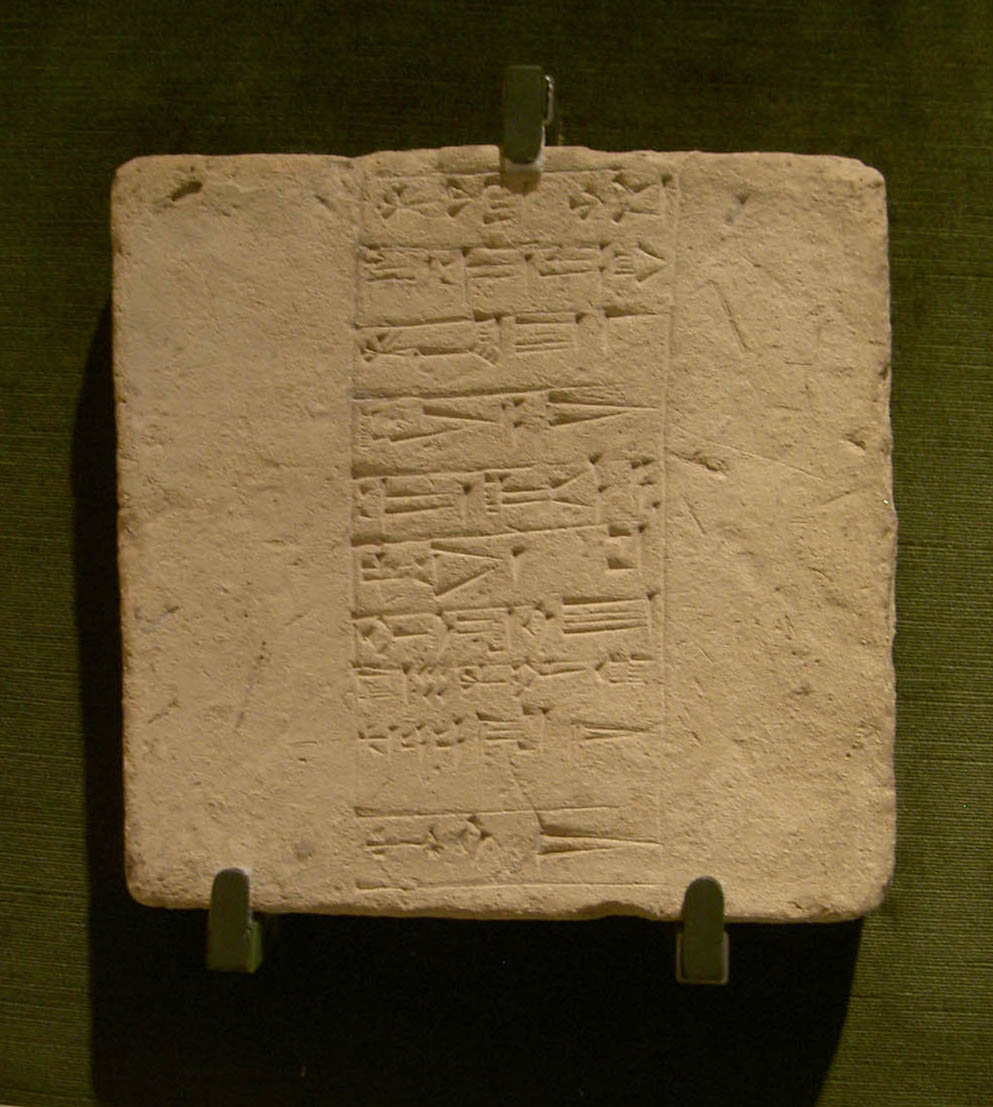
Inscribed brick. National Archaeological Museum of Madrid..

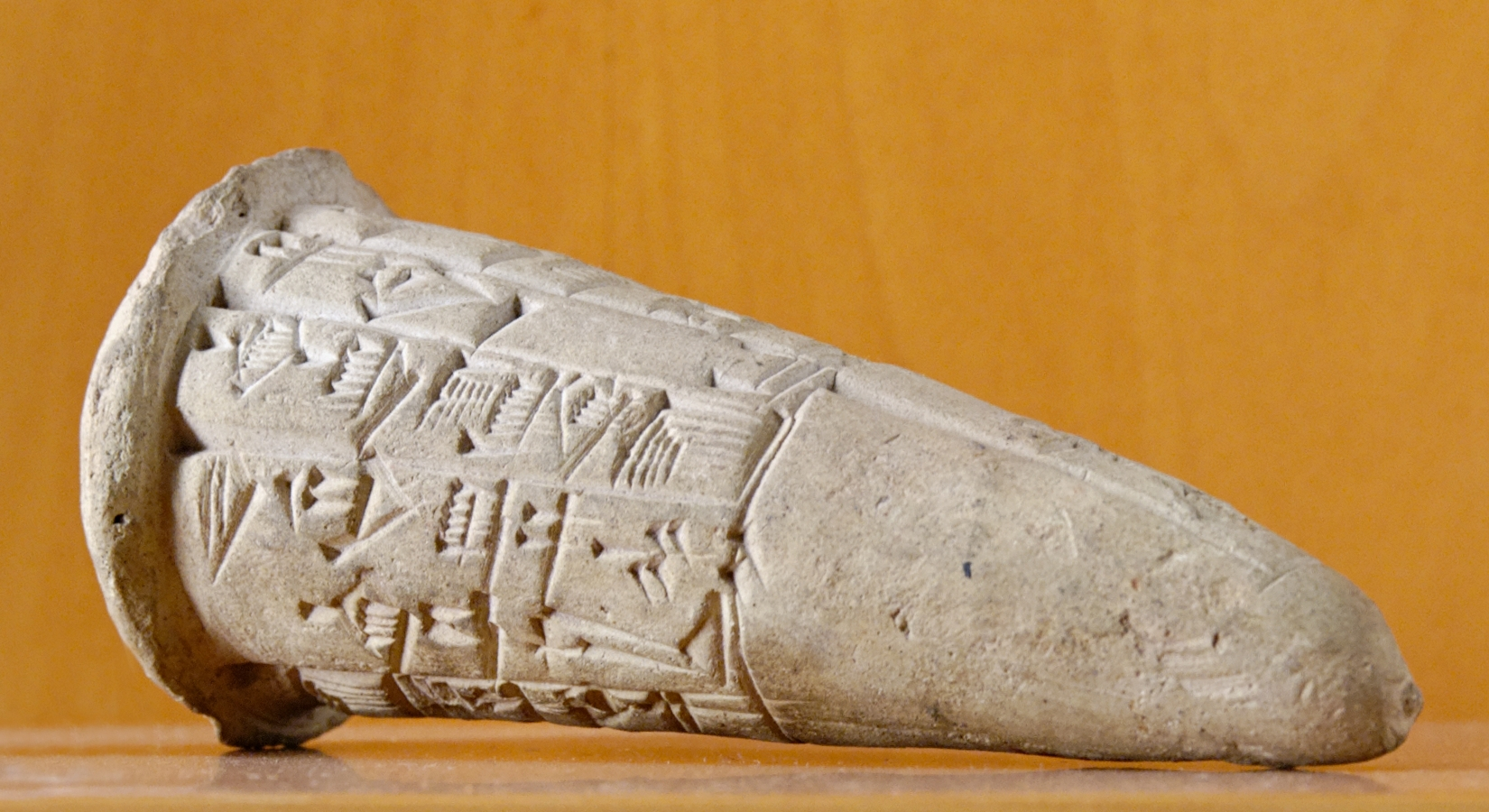
Foundation nail. Museum of Fine Arts of Lyon

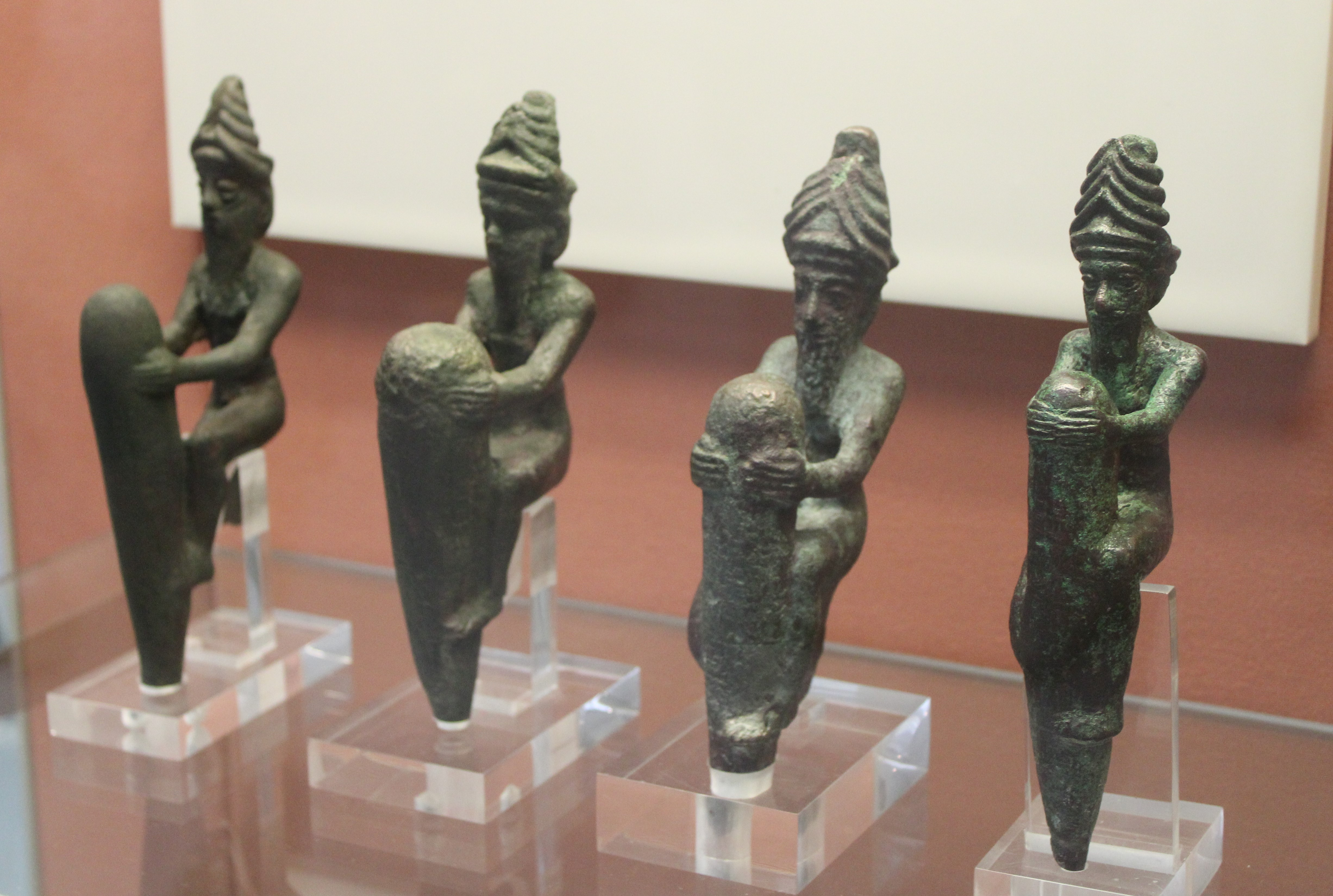
Nails-foundation figurines in the shape of deities. British Museum.

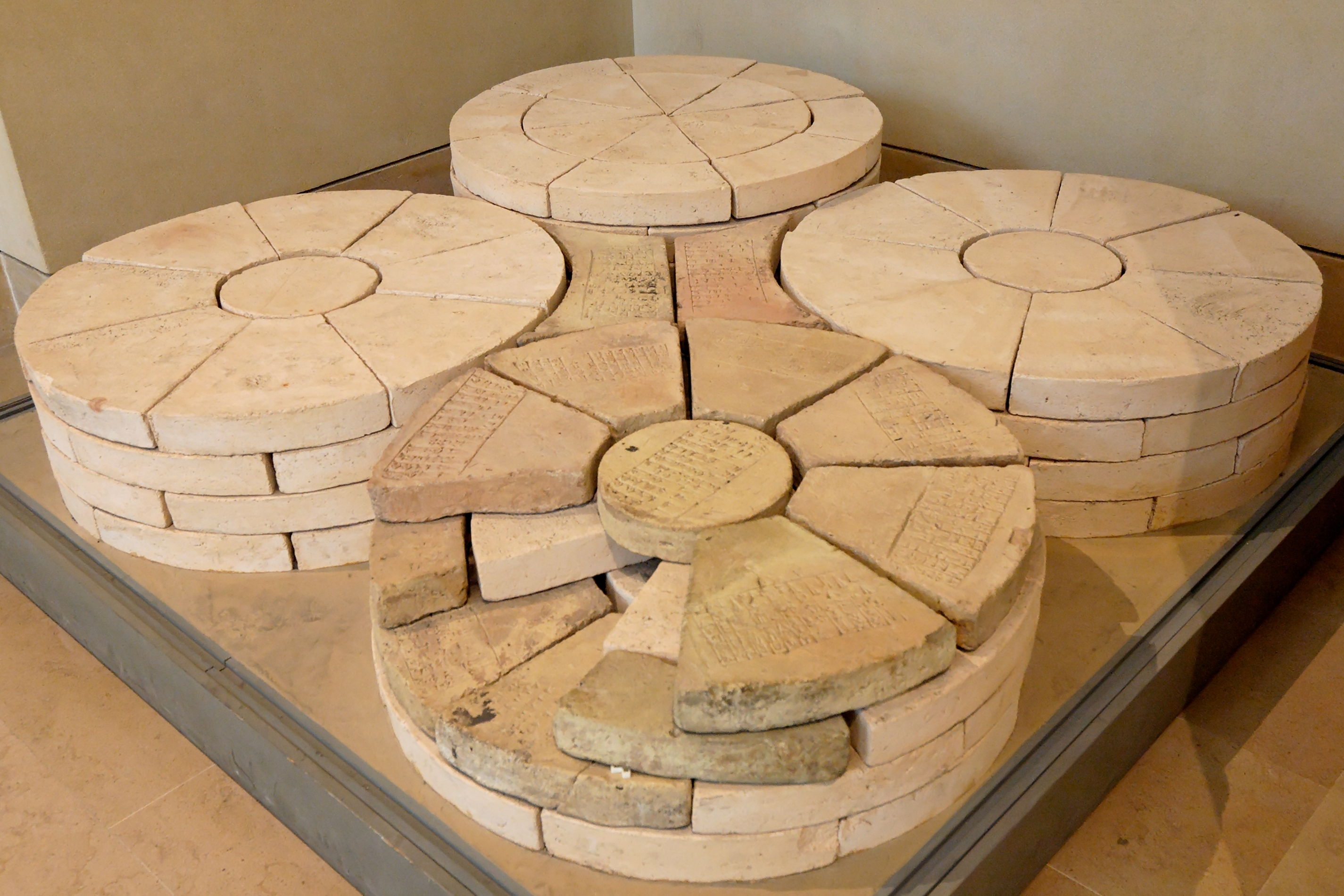
Pillars of Gudea, from a gate of the sanctuary, where justice was administered. Louvre Museum.

The construction undertaken by Gudea is, as far as we know, the major project of his reign, the one that has left the most written sources. In official discourse, it takes on considerable importance: the fate of the sanctuary is linked to that of the kingdom; it must serve to glorify the god Ningirsu and Gudea, to make their name known throughout the world, and to ensure abundance for the land of Lagash. This reconstruction is documented by numerous inscriptions of Gudea: short and stereotyped, repeated on several copies, on tablets, bricks, nails, and foundation figurines; more developed on statues (notably B); much longer in two clay cylinders, the "Gudea cylinders."

==== Gudea cylinders ====
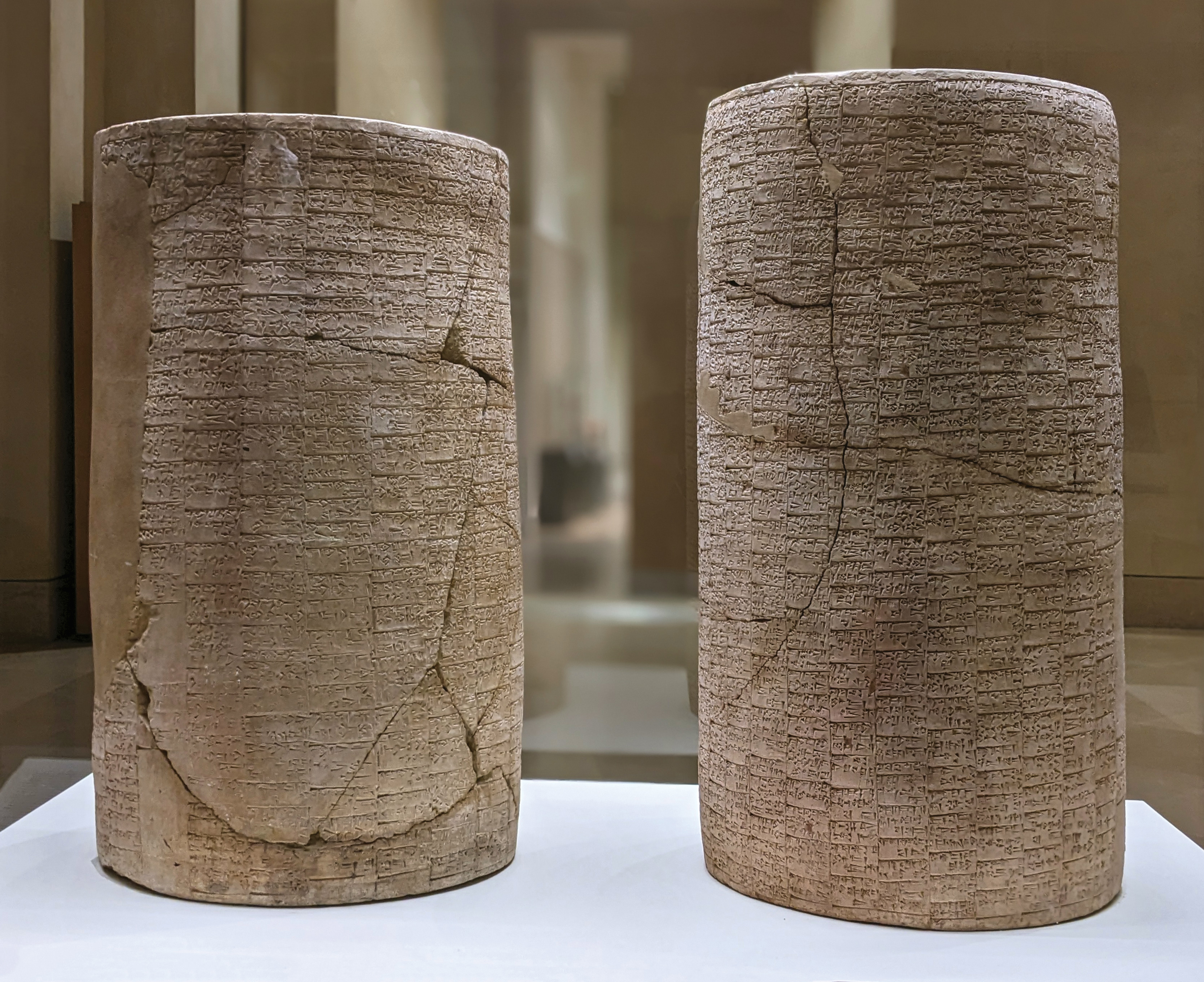
The Gudea Cylinders. Louvre Museum.

Gudea's two cylinders are designated by the letters A and B, respectively. Discovered in 1877 on Tell I at Telloh, and shipped to France the following year to enrich the Louvre's collections, they received their first comprehensive translation by François Thureau-Dangin in 1905. Other cylinder fragments unearthed at the same site have been compared to these two cylinders, but they do not appear to fit within the same group. Knowledge of the Sumerian language and these texts has progressed since the beginning of the 20th century, notably thanks to the work of Adam Falkenstein and his student Dietz Otto Edzard. The general structure of the text is understood, but in detail, various passages remain difficult to decipher, and the (rare) complete translations sometimes diverge considerably depending on the translator.

Cylinder A chronicles the construction of the temple, from the divine order to begin the project to the completion of the building, while Cylinder B recounts the temple's inauguration, with the entry of its tutelary deities and the festivities commemorating the event. The narrative dwells on certain passages in particular while moving more quickly through others; long prayers punctuate the narrative.

The Cylinders belong to the tradition of Sumerian narratives about temple building, of which they are the most developed example. More broadly, they are considered one of the masterpieces of Sumerian poetic literature, if not the oldest example of a major literary work in this language.

- Beginning of the poem:

When destinies had to be decreed in the universe,
Lagaš excelled regarding the great mes (divine powers or rituals).
Enlil looked approvingly at lord Ningirsu.
In our city an everlasting thing appeared.
The heart was satisfied.
Enlil's heart was satisfied.
The heart was satisfied.
The mighty flood sparkled, inspiring respect.
Enlil's heart, like the Tigris, carried pleasant water.
The house has been chosen by its master.
He will make Eninnu's mes visible in the universe.
The ruler, a man of vast intelligence, will apply his mind.
He will foster something truly grand.
He will direct perfect bulls and perfect kids.
He will carry the destined brick on (his) head.
He will strive to build the pure house.
It was at day in a revelation dream
that Gudea saw his master, lord Ningirsu.
He spoke to him about the building of his house.
He showed him Eninnu's very great mes.

=== Ningishzida, the personal god ===
Ningishzida is Gudea's personal god, who refers to him as "his god". This is a god whose main place of cult is located in Gishbanda, somewhere between Lagash and Uruk. He is associated with nature, agriculture, the underworld, and snakes. His cult is poorly attested in Lagash before Gudea's reign. The reason why this ruler chose to promote the cult of this deity is difficult to figure out: beyond a personal connection with this god, the motivations were undoubtedly also political; perhaps he saw it as a way to legitimize his ascension to the throne and the establishment of a new dynasty.

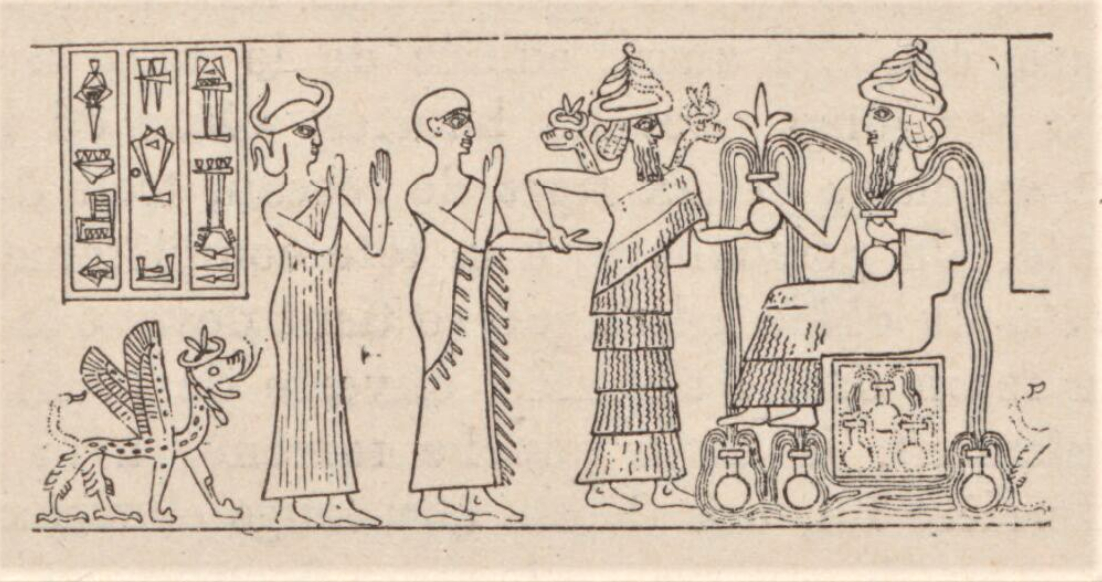
Copy of the impression of the cylinder seal of Gudea: Gudea (the bald man in the center) is led by the god Ningishzida, recognizable by the horned serpents depicted above his shoulders, to a god on a throne (Enki ?).

The integration of this god into the religious landscape of Lagash involved establishing relationships with local deities. He was "married" to Geshtinanna, who was not usually his consort; she was another new figure in the kingdom, having been promoted by Ur-Bau, Gudea's predecessor. Ningishizda was portrayed as a paternal figure, crucial to the success of Gudea's endeavors. The god served as an intermediary for the king to access other gods, as indicated by the image on his cylinder seal, which depicts him being led by the god before another deity seated on a throne. He helped him on several occasions to build temples dedicated to other gods, particularly in the story of the Cylinders, as well as in the marriage rite between Ningirsu and Bau. ·

Gudea had a sanctuary for Ningishzida built at Girsu, as well as one dedicated to his consort Geshtinanna. It has not been the subject of regular excavations, but was targeted by clandestine diggers at the beginning of the 20th century, who unearthed several statues of Gudea dedicated to the divine couple. Somewhat later, archaeologists uncovered foundation documents and votive objects from the period, but were unable to fully identify the architectural remains.

The inscription on Statue I relates the construction of the temple of Ningishzida, and takes care to integrate the god into the divine circle of Lagash, notably by proclaiming that it is Ningirsu who is responsible for the construction of his new dwelling:

When Ninĝirsu, the powerful warrior of Enlil, had established a dwelling in the city and established fields and canals on the agricultural land for Ninĝišzida, child of Ninazu, the beloved of the gods, (and when) for Ninĝirsu, his master, Gudea, ruler of Lagaš, the just person who is loved by his personal god, had built his E-ninnu-anzud-babbar and the E-ĝidru, his temple of seven niches, then for Nanše, the mighty lady, his lady, he built her E-sirara, the mountain rising from among the houses, for the great gods of Lagaš, he built their temples, (and) for Ninĝišzida, his personal god, he built his temple in Ĝirsu. (...) (Gudea) fashioned his own statue, named it for his sake "(Ninĝišzida) granted well-being to Gudea, the temple-builder”, and brought it before him into the temple.

=== The marriage of Ningirsu and Bau ===
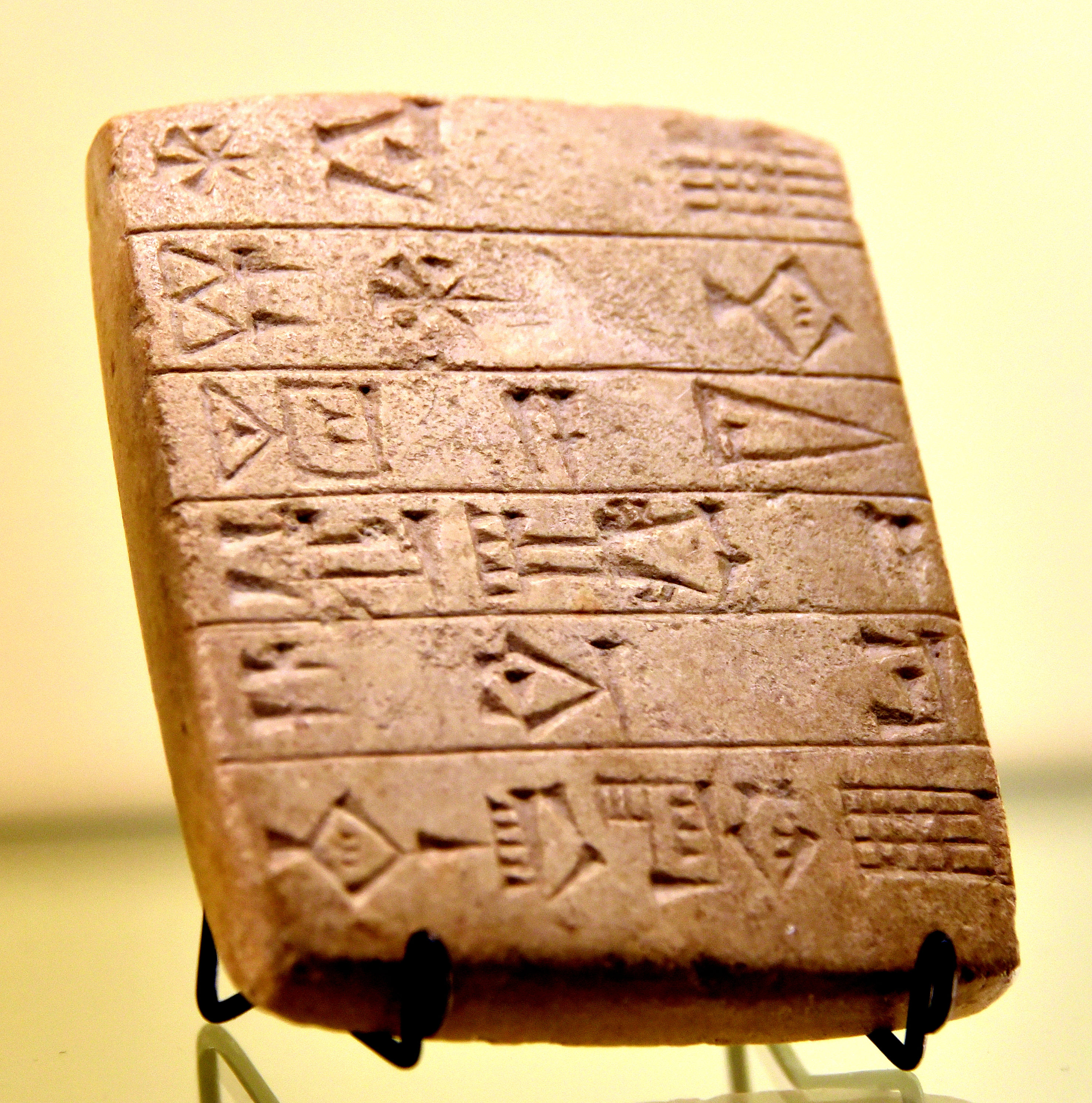
Inscription commemorating the (re)construction of the Bau temple by Gudea. Pergamon Museum.

The association between Ningirsu, Ningishzida, and Gudea is particularly evident in the documentation related to the divine marriage rite of Ningirsu and Bau (or Baba), one of the major religious festivals of the land of Lagash. References to this rite are found in the Cylinders, which mention the presence of the nuptial bed of the divine couple in the Eninnu. It is marked by the groom's gift of presents to the bride's family (often referred to as the "bride price"), as was the custom in Sumerian tradition. The inscription on Statue E of Gudea, dedicated to the goddess Bau on the occasion of the reconstruction of her temple in Girsu, called Tarsirsir and located in the place called Uru-kù(g) (or Iri-kù(g); "Sacred City" or "Bright City," perhaps a designation for the "sacred quarter" of Girsu, also including the sanctuary of Ningirsu), indicates that Gudea then increased the quantity of presents given to her on this occasion. It is Ningishzida who is in charge of giving the gifts, a role traditionally given to the groom's best friend: it established an intimate link between Ningirsu and this god, and through him Gudea. This relationship created by the wedding gifts is also mentioned in the inscription of Statue G, dedicated to Ningirsu:

Ninĝirsu dispatches the joyful bridewealth of Bau, the child of An, his beloved spouse, from this (temple). (Gudea's) personal god, Ninĝišzida follows them, (and) Gudea, ruler of Lagaš, escorts them from Ĝirsu to Iri-kug to congratulate (on the occasion).

A Hymn to Bau for Gudea (or Gudea A), known from a later period copy, also evokes the links between the goddess and Gudea, again in relation to Ningirsu.

== Posterity ==
=== Aftermath ===
Lagash was incorporated into the kingdom of Ur III after the reign of Gudea, apparently under his fifth successor, Nam-mahani, who was married to a sister of his wife. This likely occurred towards the end of the reign of Ur-Namma (which ended in 2095 or 2092 BC according to the common chronology). The annexation was probably peaceful, since no military conquest of Lagash is mentioned by Ur-Namma or his son and successor Shulgi. The province of Girsu appears to have held a special and important status in the new empire, which may have resulted from the negotiations that led to its integration.

=== Cult and commemorations after death ===
It is within this context of a wealthy province in the hands of a powerful local elite that Gudea was deified and received a cult, which was manifested in offerings made to him during the kingdom's religious festivals and by the presence of a priest (gudu_{4}) dedicated to him. His statues may have served during this cult. This is not an anomaly for this period: the other ancient kings of Lagash also received offerings, and the kings of Ur III were deified during their lifetimes, beginning with Shulgi. But Gudea seems to have a special place in Lagash within this group of deified humans, receiving more honors than the others, his name also being used in personal names as a theophoric element. Two cylinder seals from this period depict him in presentation scenes, in the position of the main deity, seated on a throne, before whom the seal bearer is brought. This position is also occupied by kings of Ur III in seals from this period. Gudea seems to have become a kind of "local hero" of the province of Girsu.

After the fall of the Third Dynasty of Ur, the Girsu/Lagash region slowly declined during the early centuries of the 2nd millennium BC. The memory of Gudea was preserved in literary texts copied in schools: the hymns to Bau and Nanshe which mention him, a Royal List of Lagash which ends with his reign, and also a text which presents itself as a copy of one of his inscriptions, evoking in particular the 537 statues which he is said to have had made, which indicates that these objects had had left a deep impression.

=== Hellenistic rediscovery ===
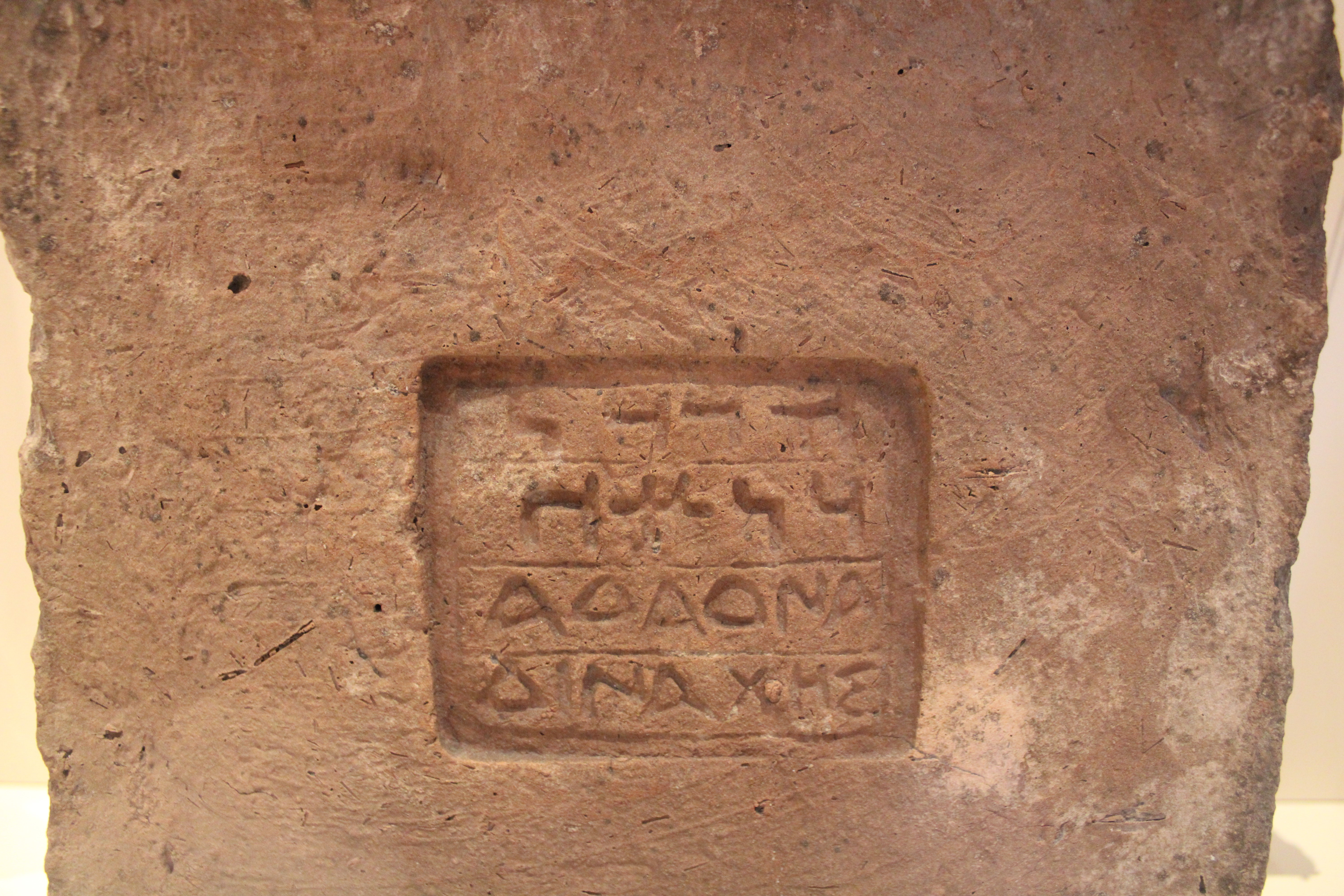
Brick stamped with the name of Adad-nadin-ahhe, in the style of those of Gudea. Telloh, 2nd century BC. Louvre Museum.

The sites in the Lagash region were abandoned in the 18th century BC and did not regain importance in the following centuries. It was not until the 2nd century BC (Hellenistic period) that the site of Girsu experienced a significant reoccupation, under the leadership of a Hellenized local chieftain named Adad-nadin-ahhe. During this period, the region was frequently contested between the Seleucid (Greco-Macedonian) and Parthian kings. Adad-nadin-ahhe erected a palace on Tell A at Telloh. He had several statues of Gudea moved there, notably from the nearby ruins of the temple of Ningirsu, and they remained there until modern excavations. Adad-nadin-ahhe was therefore a kind of “antiquarian” interested in the past of the site where he lived, as well as an imitator of the latter: he reused old cylinder seals and statuettes to make foundation deposits as the kings of the past did; sections of walls were restored and imitated for new constructions which took up the format of the bricks of the time of Gudea; some bricks were stamped with his name, as Gudea did, but no longer in Sumerian because this language was then hardly understood outside the literate circles of a few sanctuaries, but in Aramaic and Greek.

== Sources ==
- Aruz, Joan, ed. (2003). Art of the First Cities: The Third Millennium B.C. from the Mediterranean to the Indus. New York: Metropolitan Museum of Art. pp. 417–448.
- Bahrani, Zainab (2017). "Gudea: Royal Portraits and the Lifespan of Images". Mesopotamia: Ancient Art and Architecture. London: Thames & Hudson. pp. 135–153.
- Edzard, Dietz Otto (1997). Gudea and His Dynasty. Toronto: University of Toronto Press. ISBN 9780802041876.
- Parrot, André (1948). Tello, vingt campagnes des fouilles (1877-1933) (in French). Paris: Albin Michel.
- Selz, Gebhard J. (2005). "Die Gudea-Dynastie (2122-2095)". Sumerer und Akkader: Geschichte, Gesellschaft, Kultur (in German). Munich: C. H. Beck. pp. 76–87.
- Suter, Claudia E. (2000). Gudea's Temple Building: The Representation of an Early Mesopotamian Ruler in Text and Image (Cuneiform Monographs, 17). Brill. ISBN 978-90-5693-035-6.
- Suter, Claudia E. (2012). "Gudea of Lagash: Iconoclasm or Tooth of Time?". In May, Natalie N. (ed.). Iconoclasm and Text Destruction in the Ancient Near East. Chicago: The Oriental Institute of the University of Chicago. pp. 57–87.
- Suter, Claudia E. (2015). "Gudea's Kingship and Divinity". In Yonah, Shamir; Greenstein, Edward L.; Gruber, Mayer I.; Machinist, Peter; Paul, Shalom M. (ed.). Marbeh Ḥokmah: Studies in the Bible and the Ancient Near East in Loving Memory of Victor Avigdor Hurowitz. Winona Lake: Eisenbrauns. pp. 499–523.
- Vacín, Luděk (2011). "Gudea and Ninĝišzida: A Ruler and His God". U_{4} du_{11}-ga-ni sá mu-ni-ib-du_{11}: ancient Near Eastern studies in memory of Blahoslav Hruška. Dresden: Islet. ISBN 978-3-9808466-6-0. OCLC 761844864.

Regnal titles
Preceded by Ur-Bau	King of Lagash c. 2144 – c. 2124 BC	Succeeded by Ur-Ningirsu
