= Statues of Gudea =

27 statues found in southern Mesopotamia

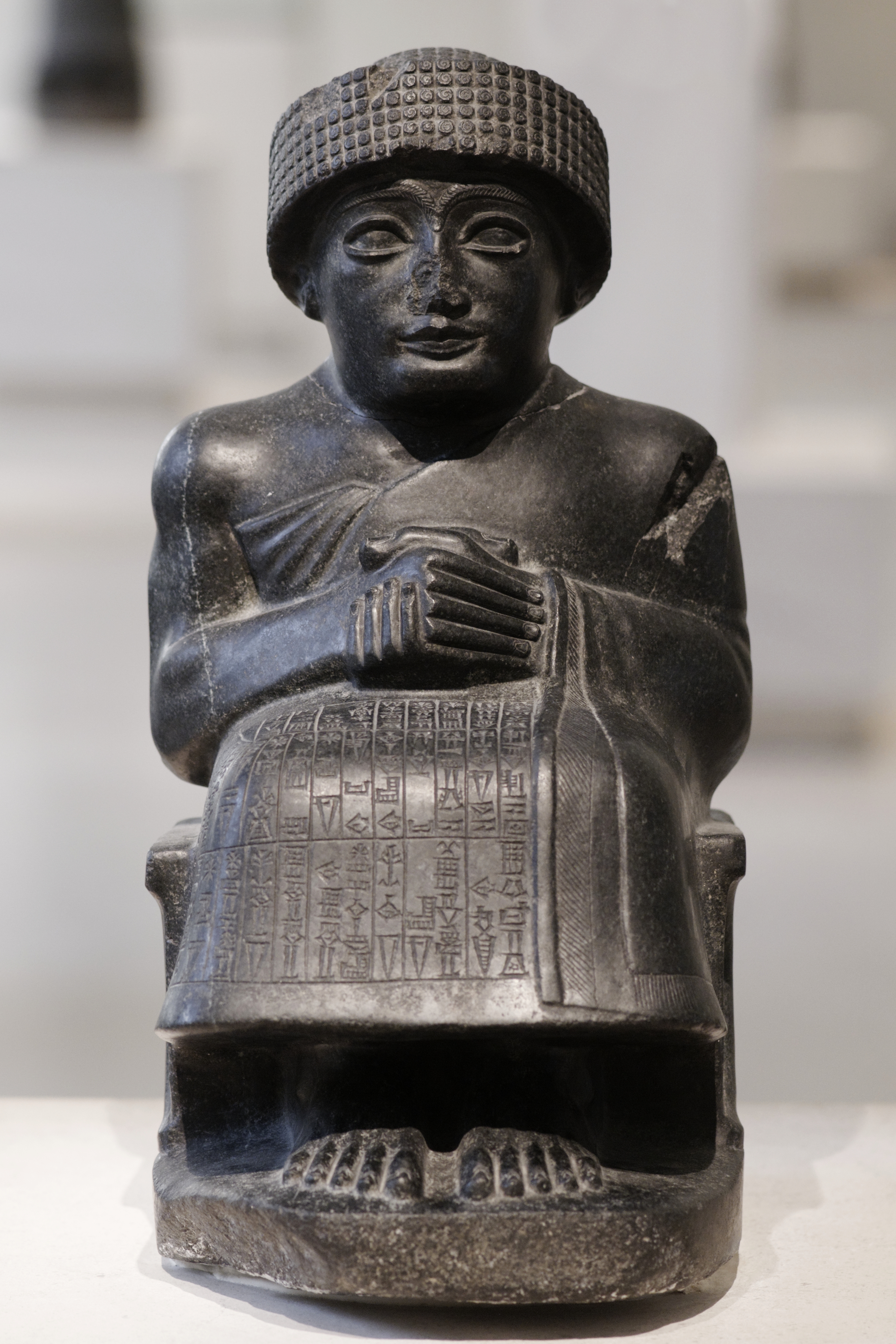
Diorite Statue I, Louvre

The Statues of Gudea are a collection of approximately twenty-seven statues of Gudea that have been found in southern Mesopotamia. Gudea was a ruler (ensi) of the state of Lagash between c. 2144 BC and 2124 BC, and the statues demonstrate a very sophisticated level of craftsmanship for that time. The known statues have been named by archaeologists as "A" to "Z" and "AA". Many statues are headless, and there are also detached heads. Gudea is named in the dedicatory inscription carved on most statues, but in some cases the identity of the ruler portrayed is uncertain.

== Provenance ==
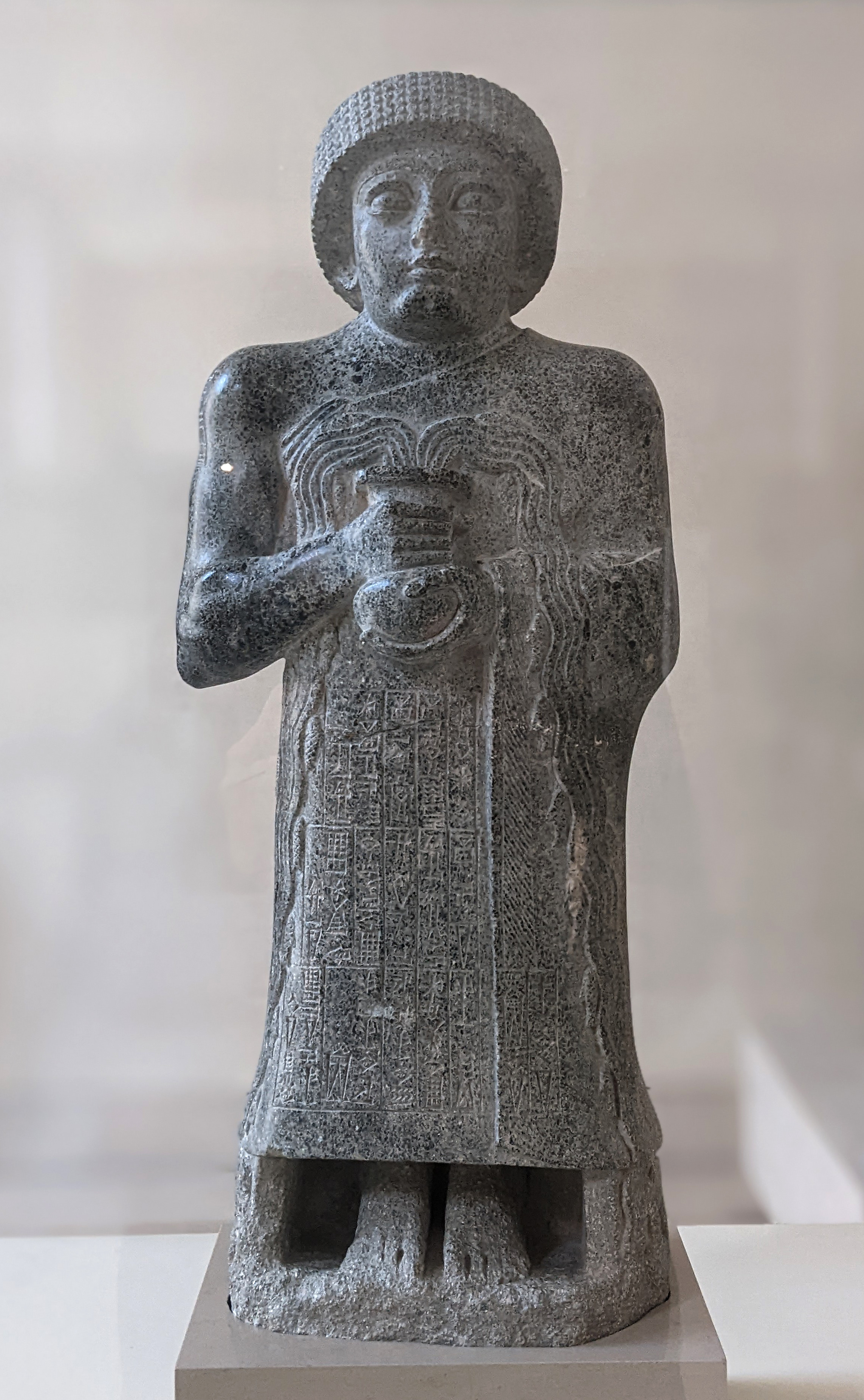
Statue N, or the “Statue with the Gushing Vase,” commemorating the construction of the temple of the goddess Geshtinanna. Louvre Museum. Unearthed during the illegal excavations at Tell V in Tello in 1924, it was acquired by a Parisian antiquities dealer and then sold to the Louvre in 1967.

The earliest known statues of Gudea were unearthed at the site of Tello, ancient Girsu, during the first French excavation campaigns that took place between 1878 and 1909, notably in the Hellenistic palace at Tell A, where they had been re-installed several centuries after Gudea’s death. They were shipped to France and are now part of the Louvre Museum’s collections. Others were found by archaeologists at other sites (Nippur, Tell Hammam). A significant number have an unknown provenance, as they originated from illegal excavations and were acquired by the institutions that now own them through the antiquities market. Seven or eight statues of Gudea and his son were thus unearthed in 1924 south of Tell V in Tello (the place of the ancient sanctuary of Ningishzida), then illegally smuggled out of the country and resold in the West to private or public collections, notably through the French antiquities dealer Elias Géjou. Among them were at least some of the statues M through Q, dedicated to Ningishzida or his consort Geshtinanna.; some of them are suspected by some scholars of being modern forgeries modeled after the authentic statues.

== Corpus ==
The number of known statues of Gudea is a matter of debate: some may be forgeries created in modern times, others may be attributable to a different ruler, while fragments of inscriptions may have belonged to destroyed statues or to stelae. According to experts, the corpus ranges from 24 to 27 statues.

The inscriptions are essentials in the process of attribution and authentification, especially for Statues M-Q that are supposed to come from illicit digs of the 1920's: Statue P may be a forgery because its provenance is unknown and its inscription is identical with that of Statue I except for the name, taken from Statue C; Statue M, also of unknown provenance and unusually made in paragonite, has an inscription that identical to those of Statues N and O, except for the name, so its authenticity as also been doubted by some specialists. While complete diorite statues of a standing king, recovered from clandestine excavations (perhaps those of 1924?), without inscriptions (anepigraphic), might represent Gudea, but there is no way to be certain.

These statues are identified by a letter (two for the last ones), originally according to the place the statues found during the regular excavations at Telloh were displayed in the Louvre, subsequent letters being assigned to others, regardless of provenance (most of them came from clandestine excavations).

To these must be added 16 isolated carved heads of Gudea (not identified by letters).

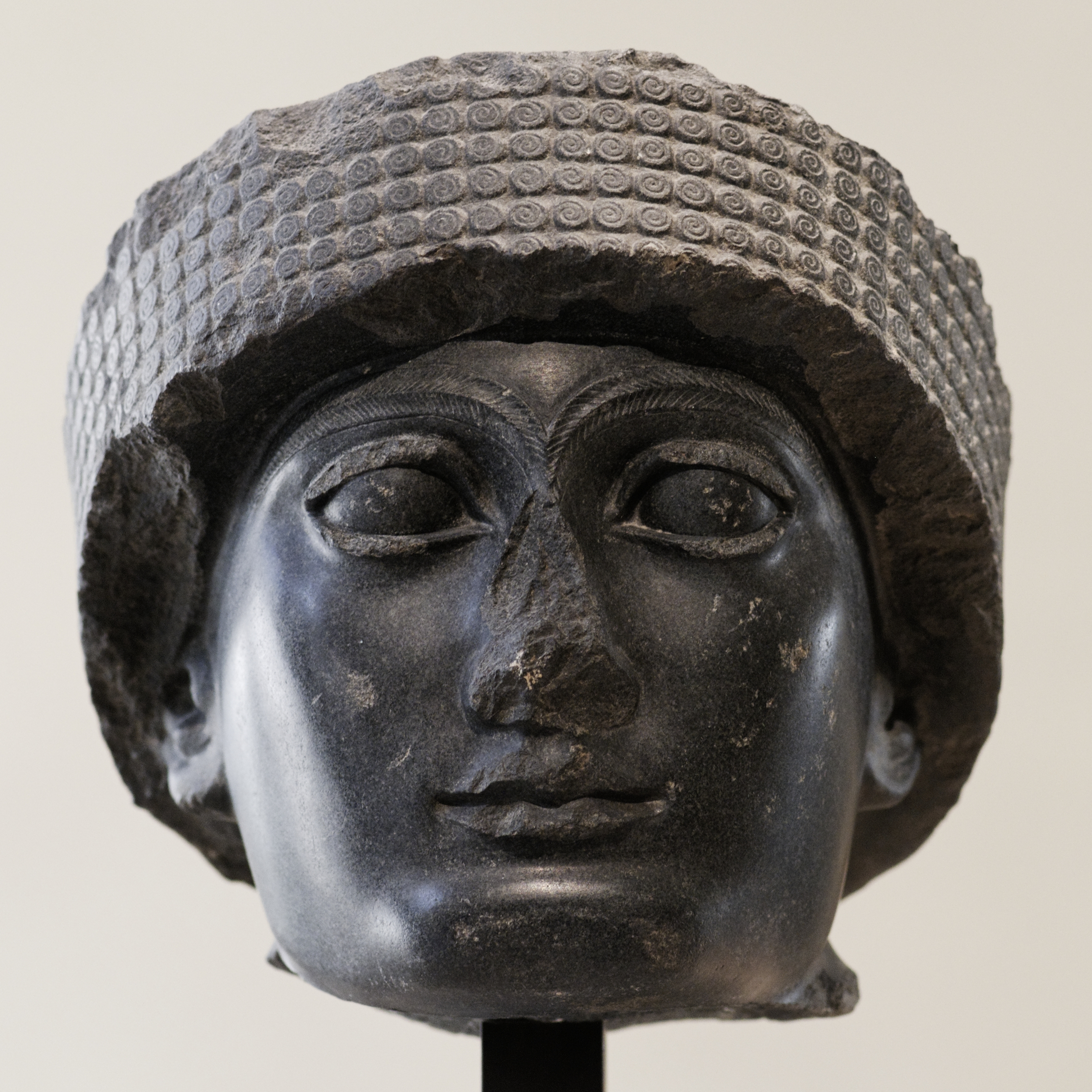
Louvre Museum.

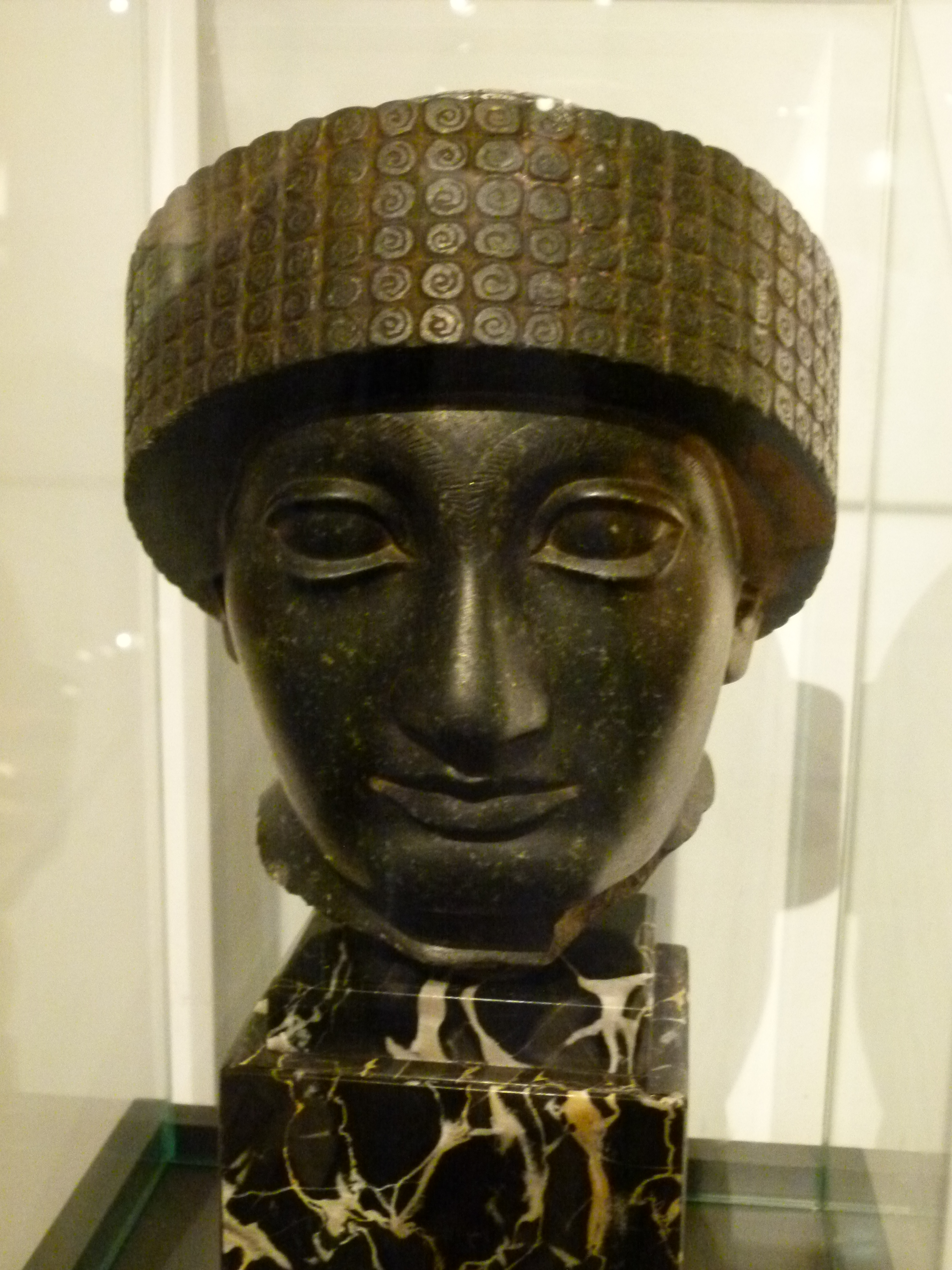
National Museum of Archaeology (Madrid).

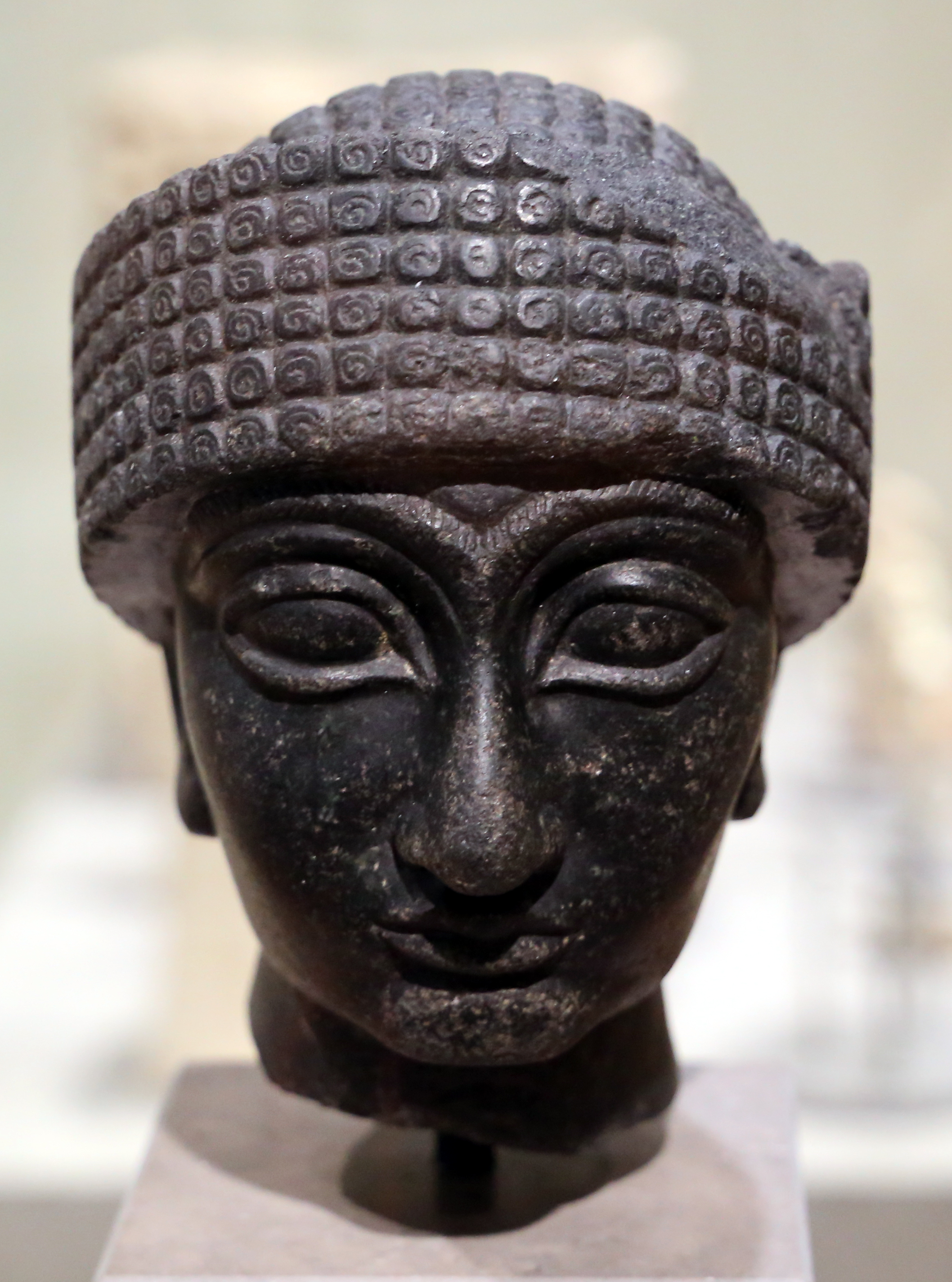
National Museum of Antiquities (Amsterdam).

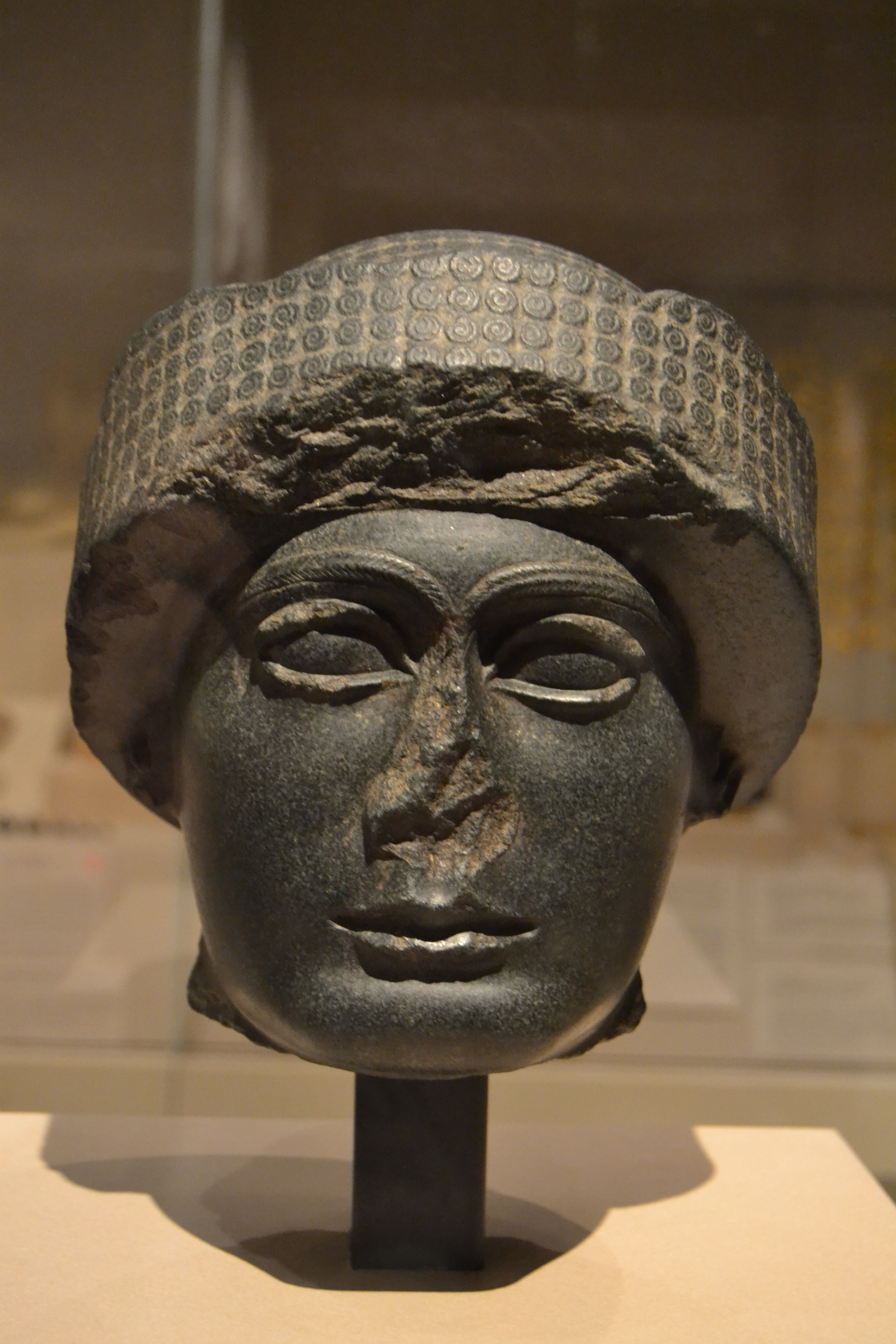
Museum of Fine Arts, Boston.

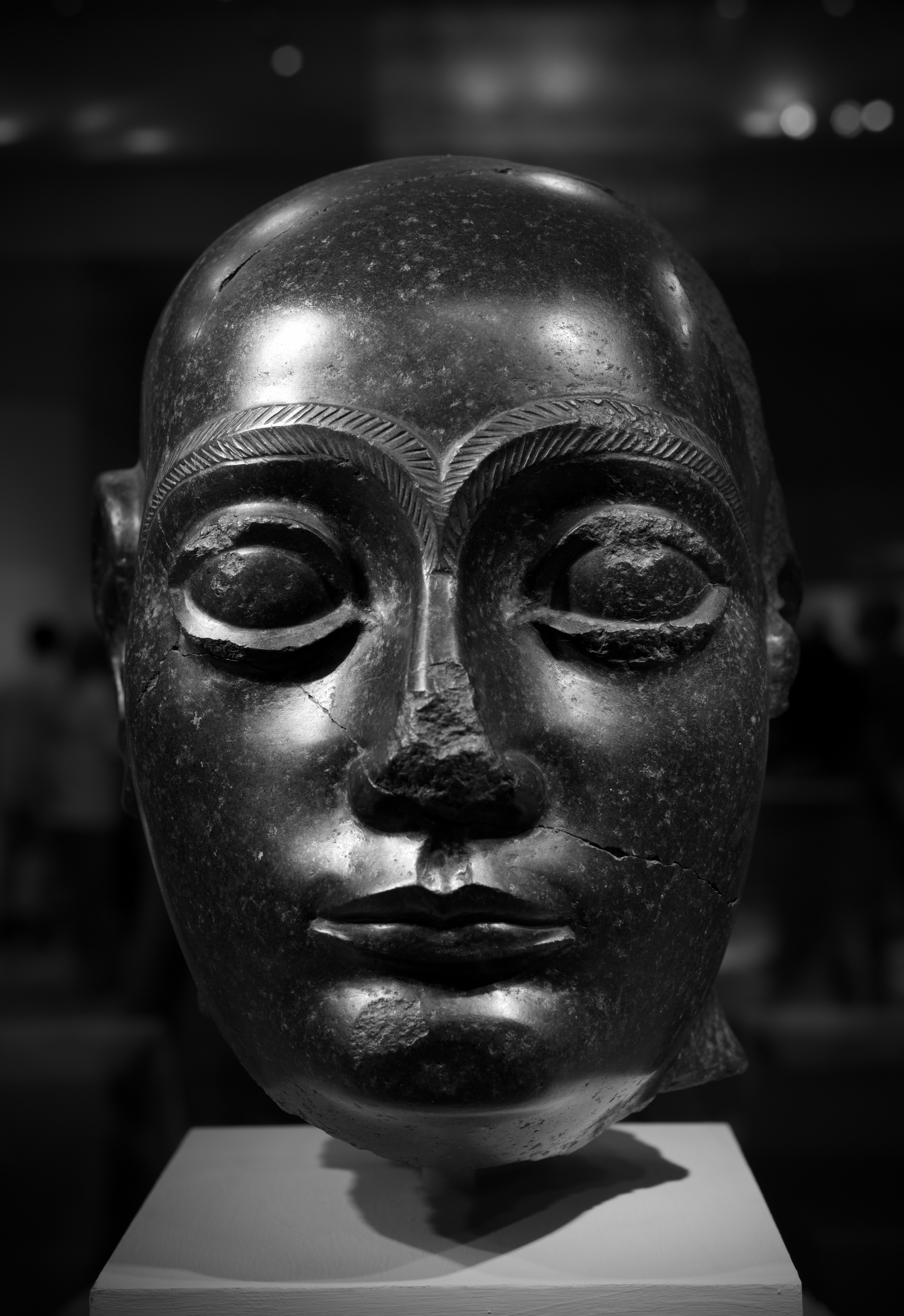
Metropolitan Museum.

Also dating from Gudea’s reign is an inscribed alabaster statue of his wife Ninalla standing (found without her head), which she dedicated for her husband’s life. Sculptors of the Second Dynasty of Lagash (and also the Ur III Dynasty) created other statues of the same type, but their style can be distinguished from those depicting Gudea. Some are royal statues depicting his predecessor, Ur-Ba'u, carved from diorite in a more compact and linear style, and his successor, Ur-Ningirsu II, carved from chlorite with more sinuous contours. In addition to these royal statues, the Lagash workshops also produced statues of high-ranking women, the best known of which is a chlorite statue of a woman wearing a scarf, with her hands clasped in prayer; only the upper body and head remain.

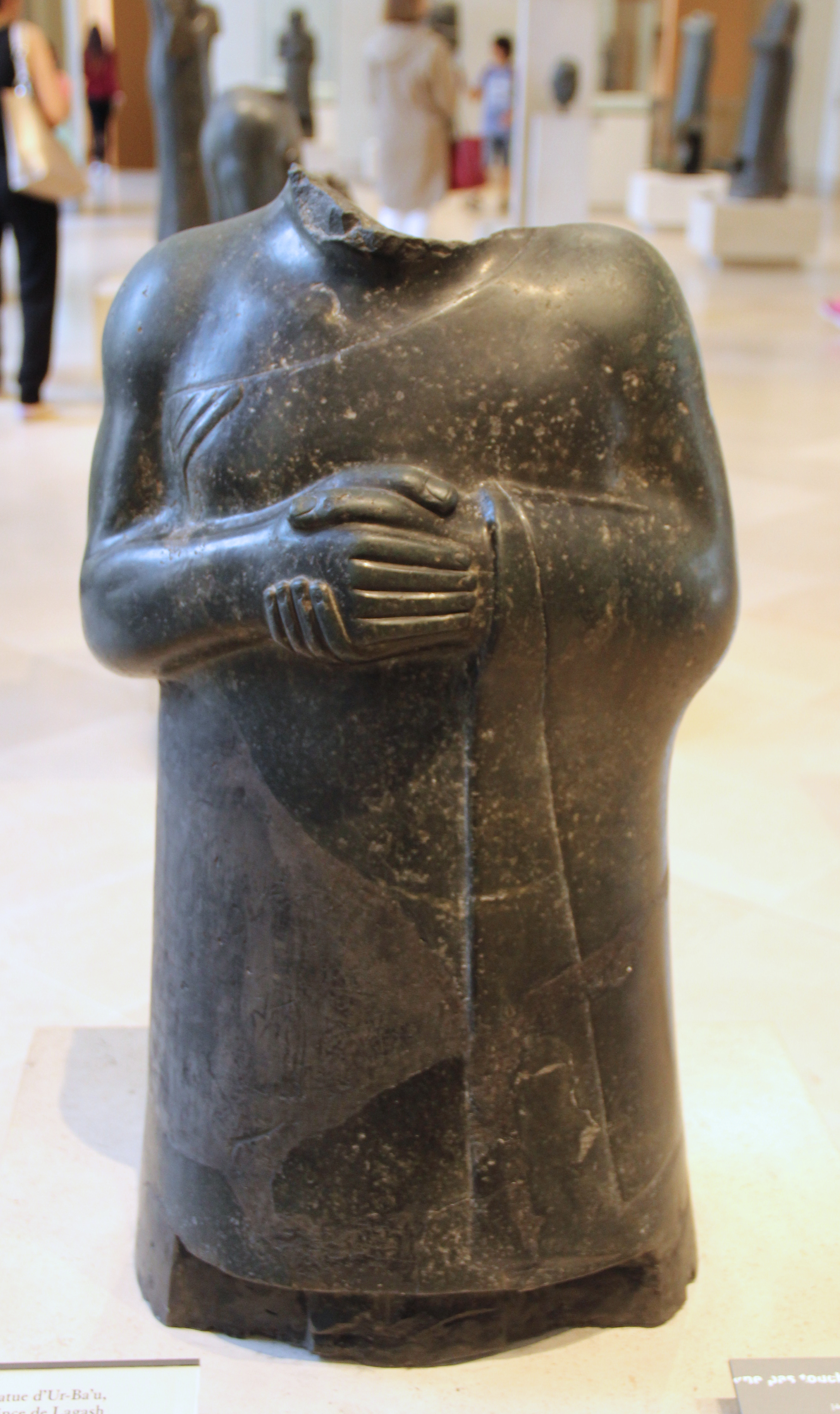
Statue of Ur-Ba'u. Louvre Museum.

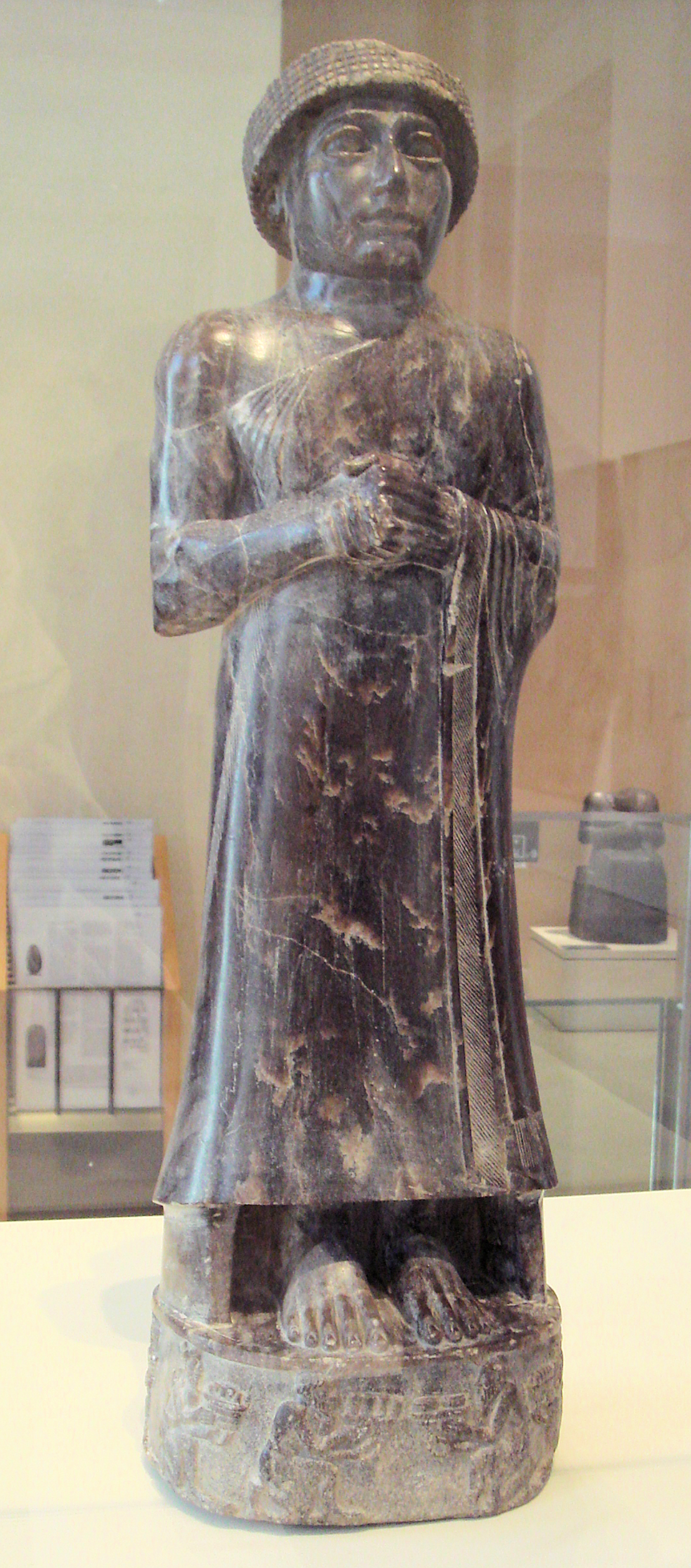
Statue of Ur-Ningirsu. Louvre Museum.

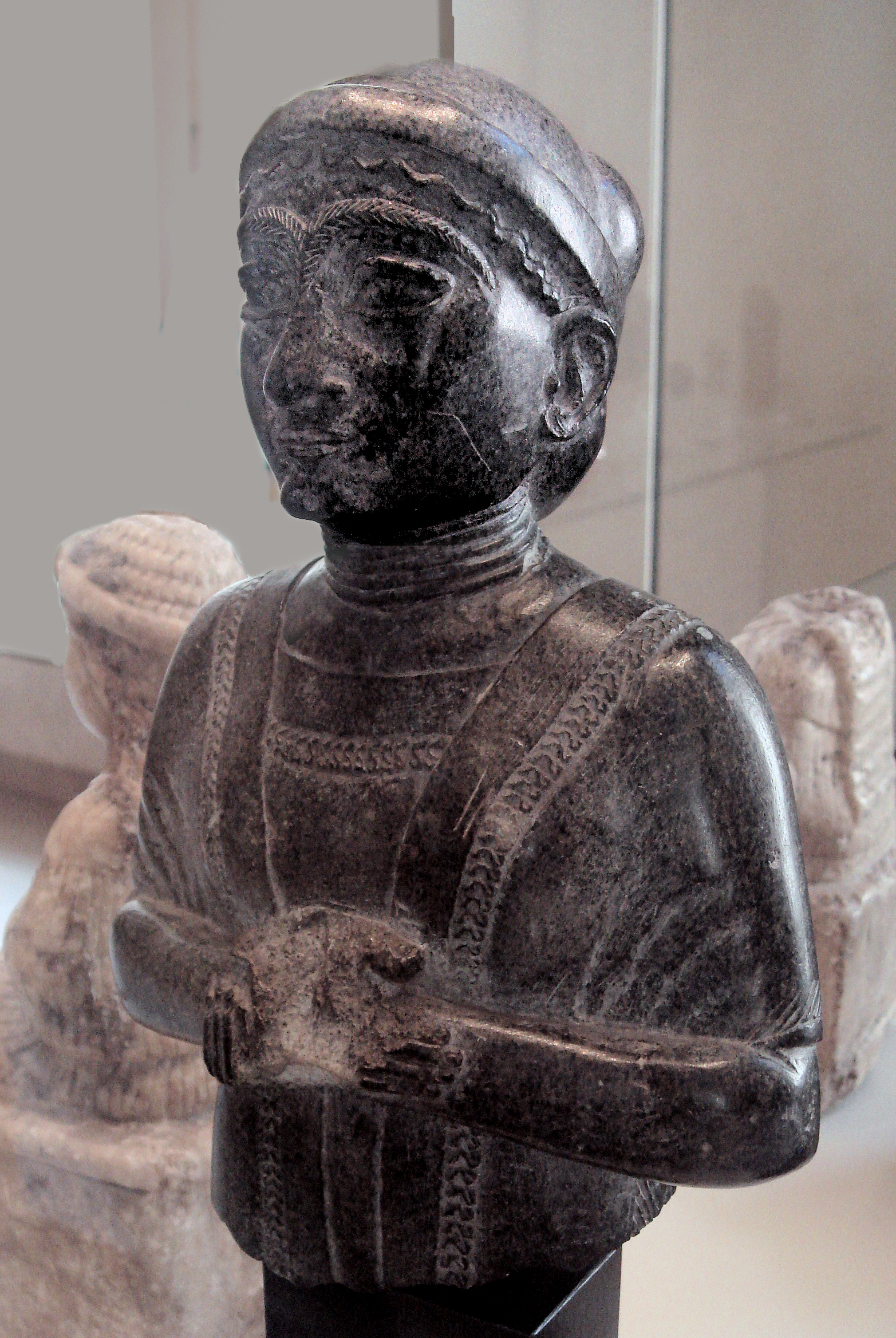
Statue of a woman with a scarf. Louvre Museum.

== Visual aspect ==
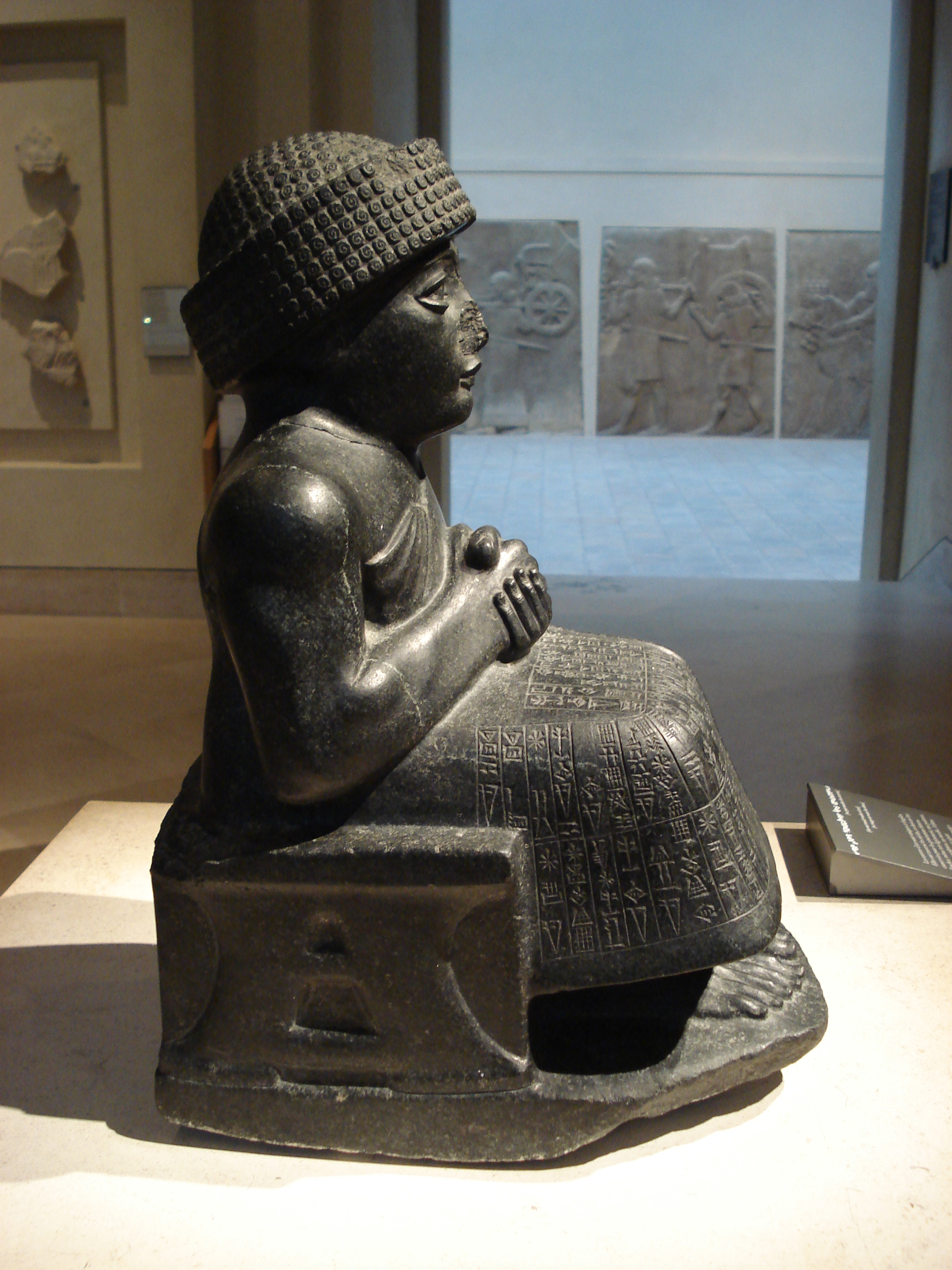
The statue H of Gudea, represented seated, dedicated to the god Ningishzida. Louvre Museum.

=== Diorite ===
Statues of Gudea are often partially destroyed (many are acephalic: the head is missing), with only a few being complete or nearly so. Nevertheless, they constitute a unique corpus for the Ancient Near East, if only in terms of quantity. The fact that so many statues of Gudea have been preserved is due to the choice of material in which most of them were made: diorite. The inscription on Statue B states that this stone was chosen to ensure their preservation, avoiding the use of metal so that they would not be melted down later. Moreover, there is no indication that he had any metal statues of himself made, unlike the kings of Akkad and Ur III. Moreover, in Sumerian thought, the stones were believed to possess specific properties and destinies, which paralled their physicical aspect. Diorite was obviously chosen because of its hardness, which made it difficult to carve, but also to destroy and desacrate. Consequently, statues fashioned from this stone could perpetuate Gudea’s prayers for eternity.

Diorite is a hard stone imported from southern Arabia. We know from the texts that it came from the "land of Magan," which corresponds to the present-day Sultanate of Oman. Gudea was not the first ruler of Lagash to use it, as it had already been used by his father-in-law Ur-Baba and, long before them, by the kings of the Archaic period. The rulers of Akkad had made it the material of choice for royal representations.

The sculptural quality of the work suggests that the workshop from which these pieces emerged had a long tradition of hard-stone carving. The use of diorite, a particularly hard stone, necessitates very massive forms in which the body parts are barely carved out of the block, resulting in a robust appearance already present in earlier Lagashite statuary. Akkadian influence is evident in the introduction of a naturalism that is particularly noticeable in the depiction of muscles.

=== Appearance and postures ===
The way in which Gudea is represented on his statues has been summarized as follows by O. W. Muscarella: "His introspective face represents a beardless man, whose wide, heavy-lidded eyes are focused, not staring, beneath a continuous bushy eyebrow. His nose is prominent but not too big, his cheeks are soft but not too fat, and his mouth is casually closed. In all the statues he wears an ankle-length garment that leaves the right shoulder bare and, with a few exceptions, he has a wide and thick-brimmed hat with curls that may represent fur. The feet are bare, the folded arms are subtly but obviously muscled, and the hands are joined with the right folded into the left, held just above the waist."

The king is depicted dressed in the manner typical of kings of the period: in a long, fringed tunic, open over the right shoulder; and, when preserved, his head is generally adorned with a wide-brimmed cap (he is bareheaded in Statue S).

He is depicted standing (at least 10 instances) or seated (7). The seat on which he sits in the latter cases appears to be a marker of his royal status, also represented on cylinder seals from the Ur III period depicting him.

A few statues are distinguished by the addition of an element: a tablet and a stylus resting on the king’s lap in Statues B and F, which depict him as an architect; the tablet shows a temple plan in the first statue, while it is blank in the second; and a vase with gushing water in Statue N.

=== Inscriptions ===
Most statues are carved with a dedicatory inscription, whose length vary. Their visual aspect is important. According to Z. Bahrani, "the inscriptions that are carved onto these statues are incorporated into the images in an important and integral way: they were considered to be part of the design rather than a supplement, and their placement upon the statue was taken into account carefully by the sculptor. The texts were given as much attention in terms of the beauty of the carving as any of the other details of the image."

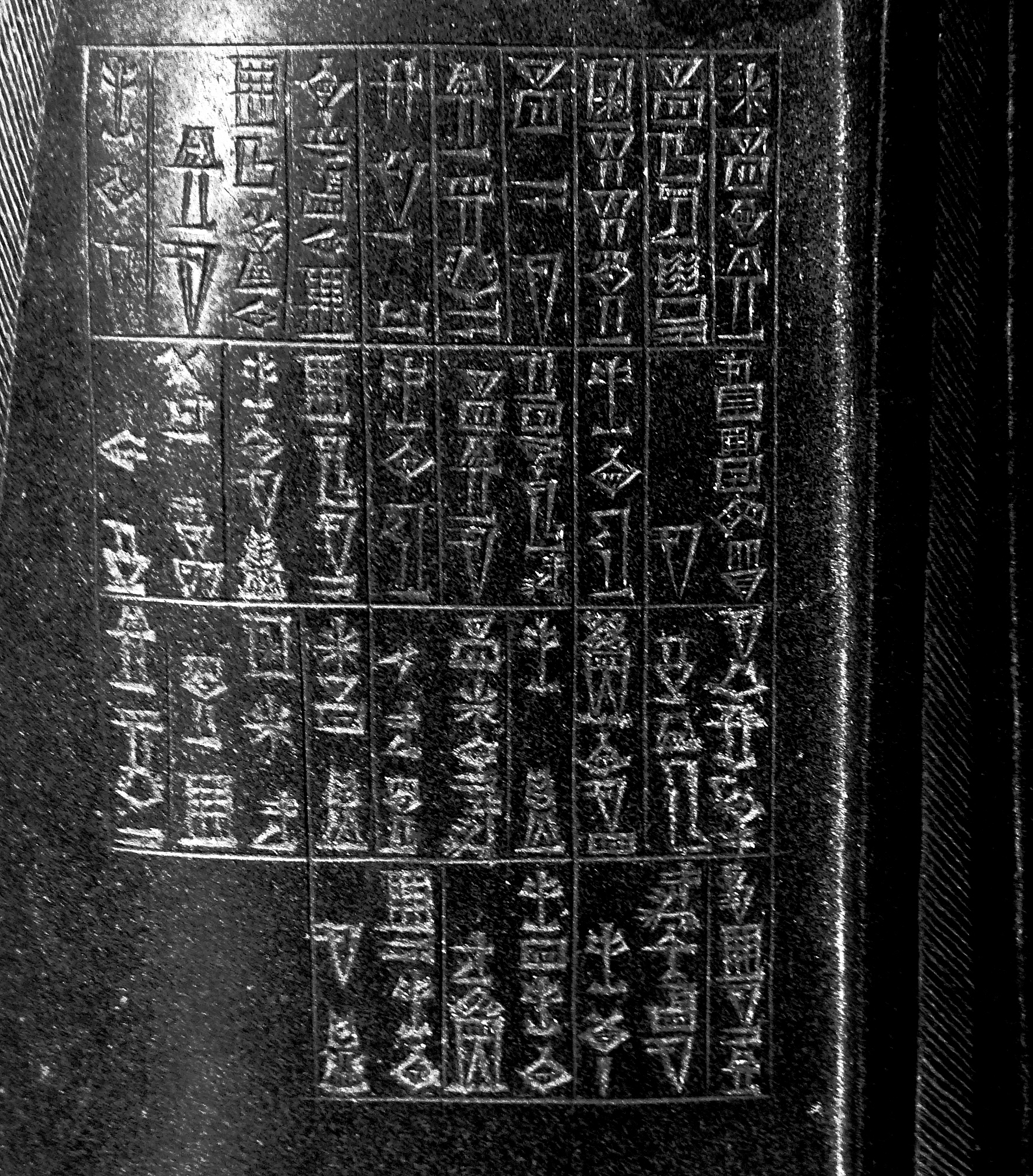
Inscription of statue A. Louvre Museum.

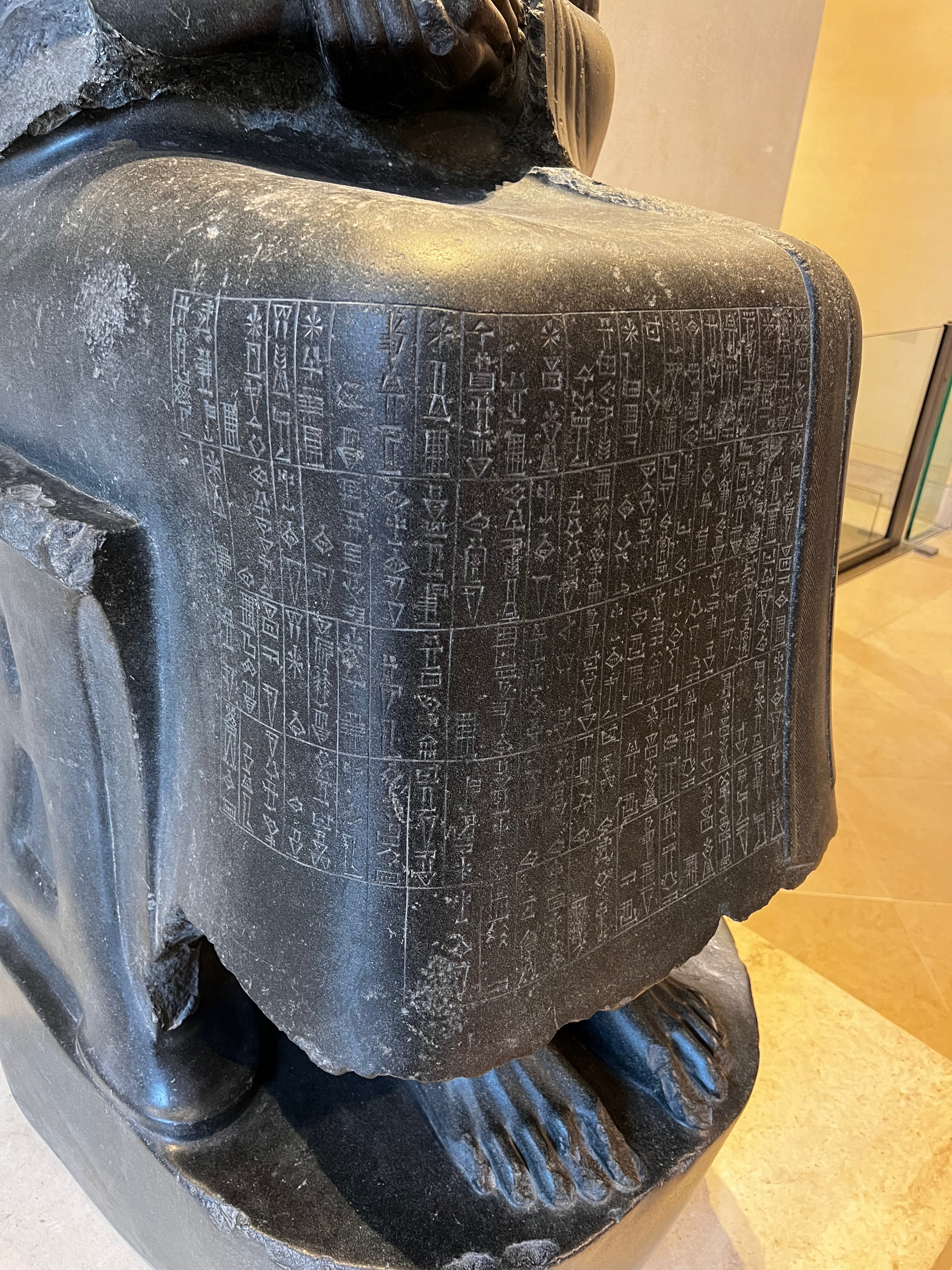
Inscription of statue D. Louvre Museum.

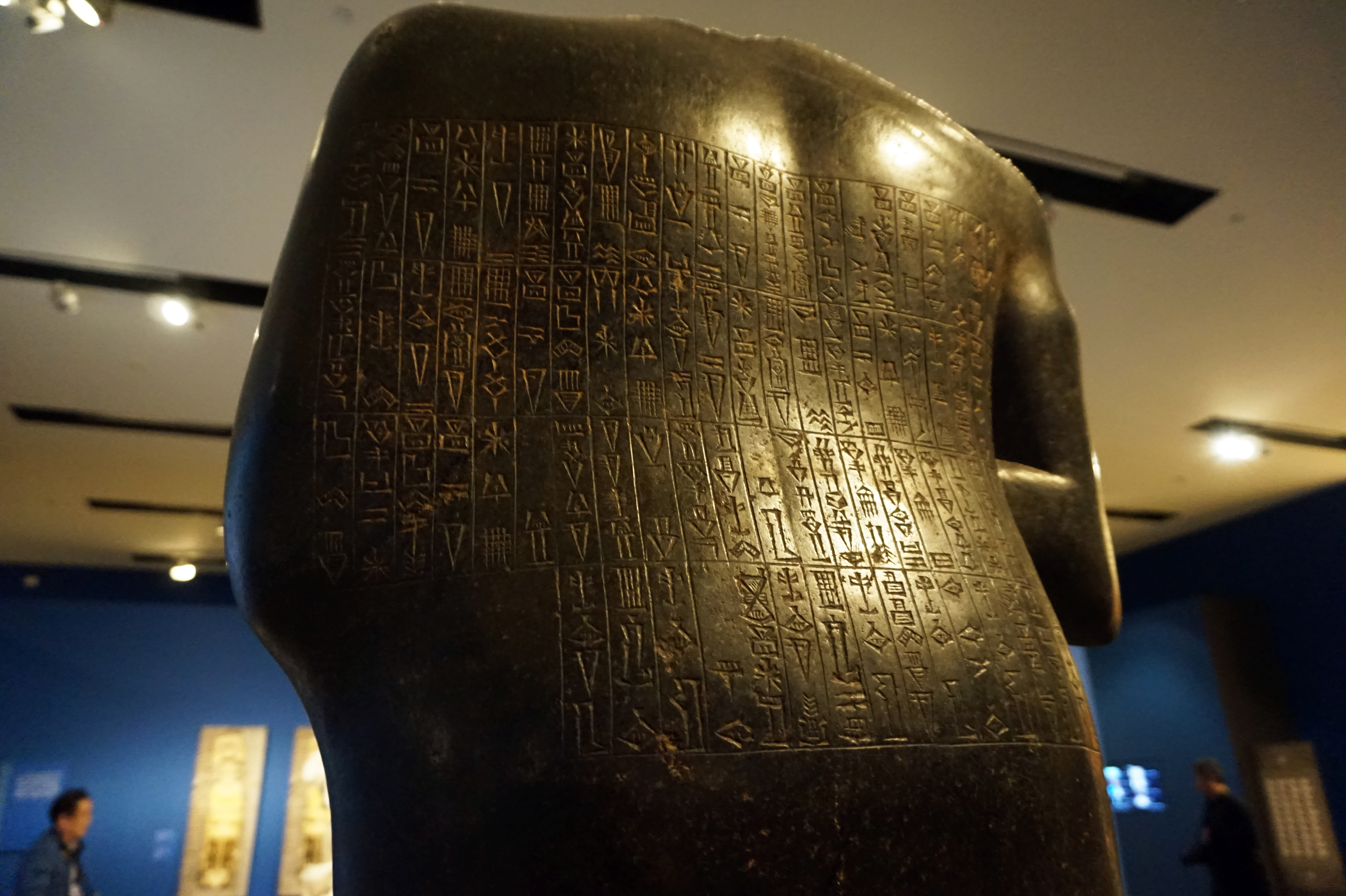
The inscription on the back of Statue E. Louvre Museum.

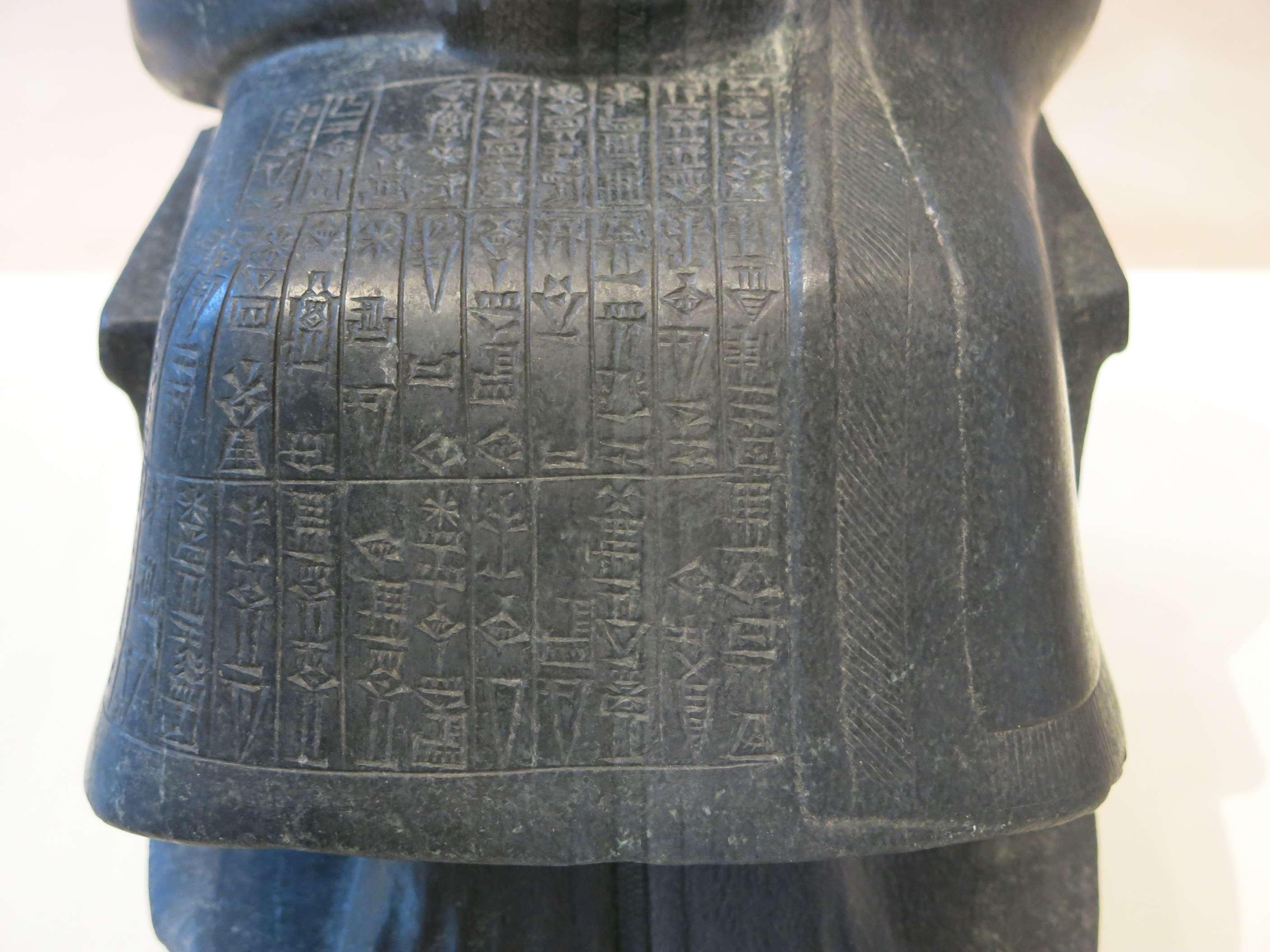
Inscription of the statue I. Louvre Museum.

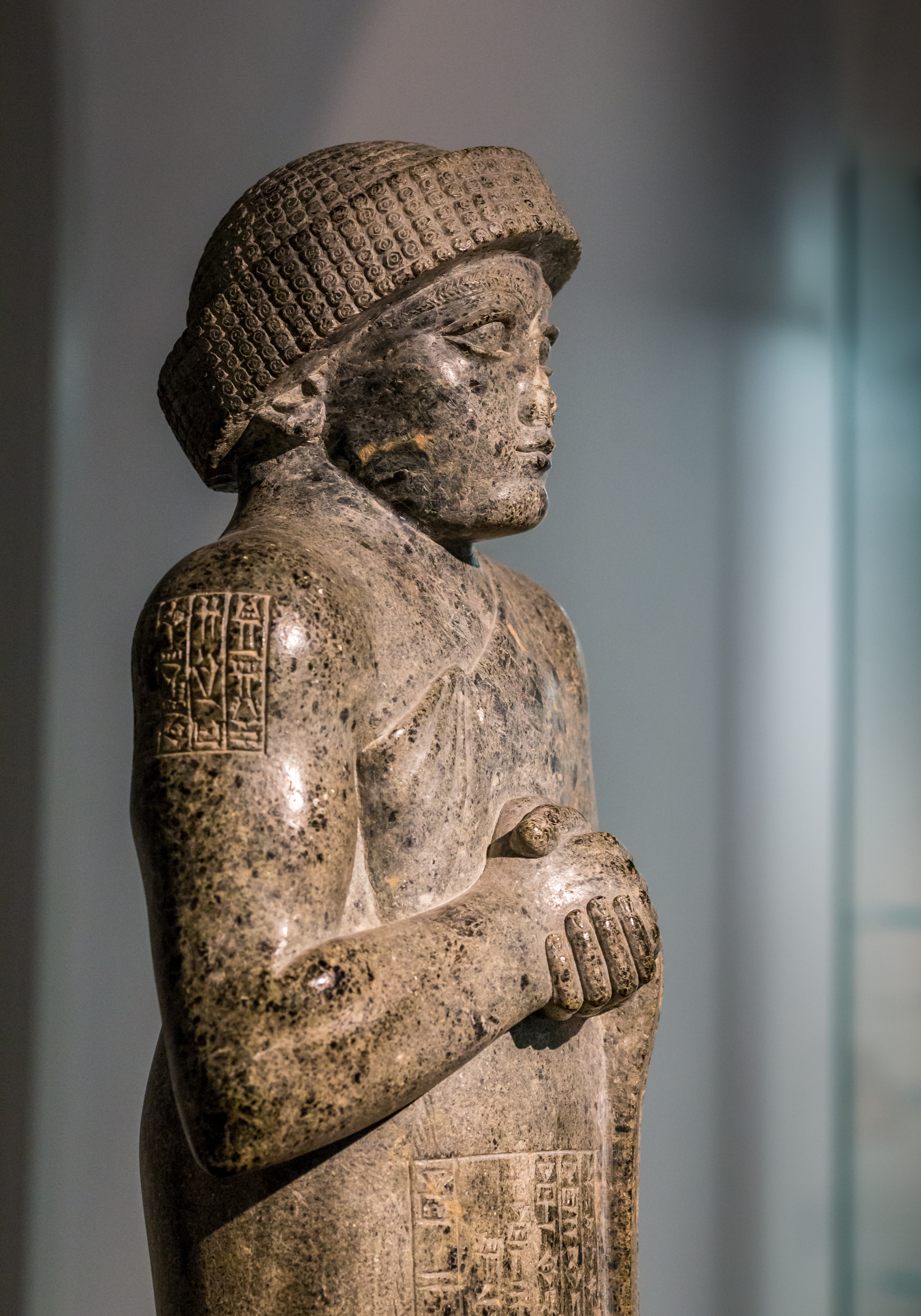
Statue O, with the name of the king inscribed on his shoulder, the main inscription appearing on his tunic. Ny Carlsberg Glyptotek.

=== The Royal Portrait ===
The statues of Gudea can be seen as an ancient form of portrait, reflecting the inner qualities and traits of the ruler, through visual signs (physiognomies) and also the inscriptions which gave some explanations or at least clues about their functions. They are not realistic portraits, trying to match physical resemblance, but rather conceptual, abstract images.

Through a joint study of the statues and their accompanying texts, as well as those of the Gudea cylinders, I. Winter has highlighted various physical characteristics of the king that reflect the different qualities the gods bestowed upon him to make him fit to reign: "By comparing the verbal representations of the ruler with his physical representation in the statues, what emerges is a consistent and coherent picture in both domains—constituting what Louis Marin, in his study of the images of Louis XIV of France, has referred to as “representations of power,” brought into being and reinforced by the “power of representation."

According to her, at least five elements stand out:

- size: some statues are life-size (Statue D even has “colossal” proportions), while most are small but appear massive, with a thickness and proportions that seem to reflect the king’s remarkable character and charisma; especially it seems that his large head is a sign of authority, distinguishing the king from the rest of the people, one inscription saying that the god Ningishzida endowed Gudea with a "rightful head," allowing him to stand out among his subjects;
- a broad body and chest: these reflect the king’s vitality, as his body is capable of containing the breath of life bestowed by the gods;
- a muscular body: a sign of vigor and strength, and thus of the king’s “heroic” character, visible above all in the king’s right shoulder and arm, which are generally exposed to public view because they are not covered by clothing; in inscriptions, he sometimes receives the epithet "strength-given one of Nindara," where the word for strength can also be read as "strong arm"
- large ears: in Sumerian symbolism, this signifies attentiveness, indicating that Gudea is receptive to divine commands, and even suggesting his great wisdom;
- large eyes: the king’s gaze is directed toward the deities, as at least some of his statues were placed in sanctuaries facing divine statues, so that the king was constantly in their presence, ready to receive their orders while demonstrating his devotion to them.

Gudea's piety is also evident in the static, calm, serene, even introspective attitude emanating from his hands. The king is at rest, not in a dynamic pose, as was often the case for the kings of Akkad. His hands are generally clasped, a gesture of prayer. The king's physical power is nonetheless manifested by his musculature.

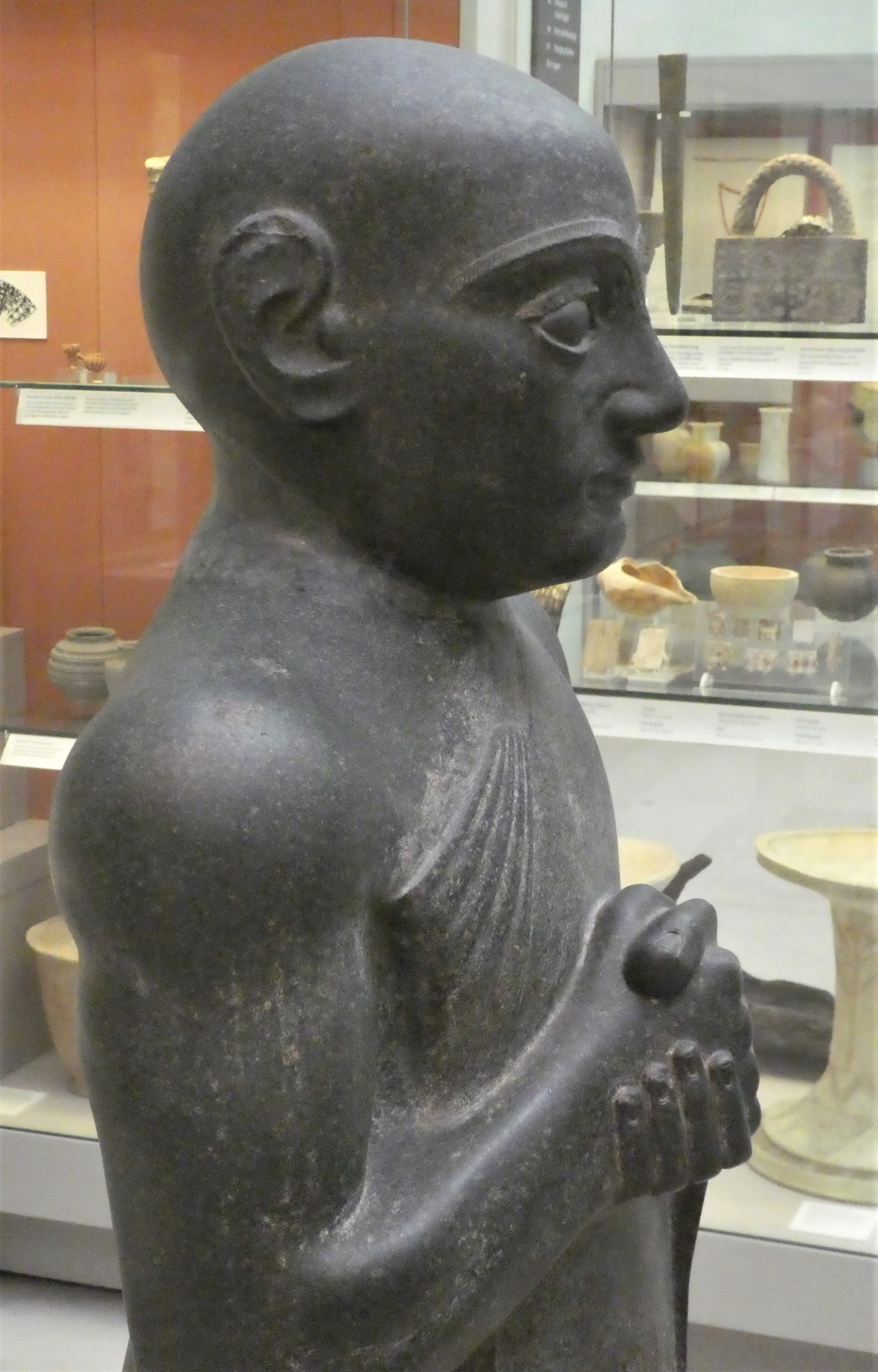
Statue V, detail: upper body with visible shoulder and arm, head reattached. British Museum.

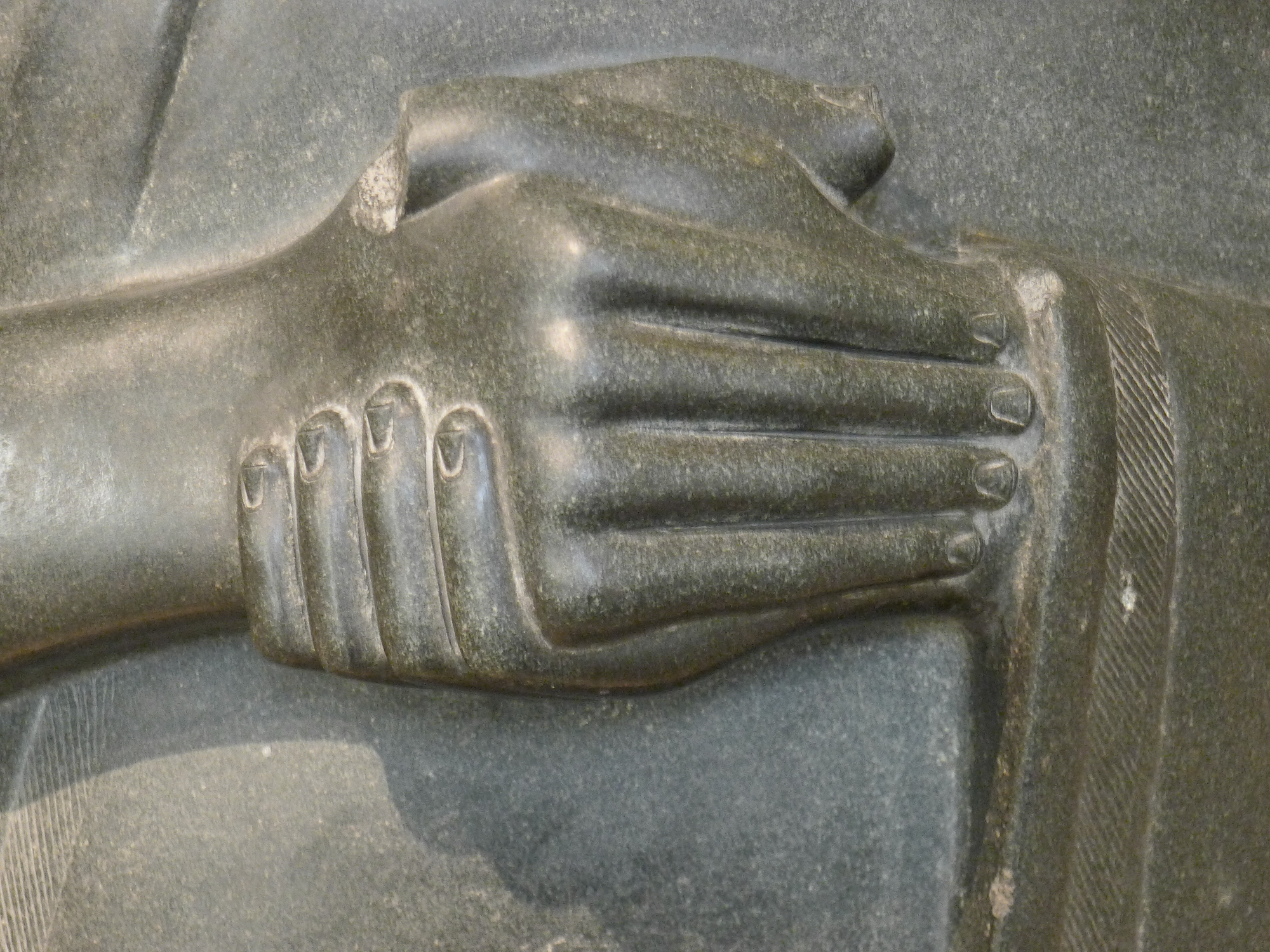
Statue A, detail of clasped hands. Musée du Louvre.

== Names and functions ==
The dedicatory inscriptions also provide details about the functions of these statues. Like other inscriptions, they indicate at least the god to whom they are dedicated and the circumstances of their consecration. Their lengths vary greatly; the shortest is that of Statue Q, which contains only the basic elements: the recipient deity, the identity of the dedicant (Gudea), the circumstances of the offering, the name of the statue, and its location:

For Ningishzida, his (personal) god, did Gudea, ruler of Lagash, who built Ningirsu's Eninnu, fashion a statue of himself. "It befits the House" - (this is how) he named (the statue) for his sake, and he brought it to him into his house.

The more extensive inscriptions, particularly that of statue B, which is the longest, contain more detailed information on the construction of the temples and the making of the statues, the ritual offerings accompanying their consecration, and even curses against those who would harm the object and the memory of Gudea.

The inscriptions indicate the names given to them, which provide insight into the roles assigned to them—roles that generally consist of bestowing divine blessings upon the king: for statue H, it is "The Lady, beloved daughter of shining heaven, Mother Ba'u (“Baba”), gave life to Gudea out of the tarsirsir House" (her temple);; for statue M, it is "It stands in (constant) prayer"; for statue P, "Let the life of Gudea, who built the house (“the temple”), be long." The names are not just indications of their functions: in Mesopotamian thought, the process of naming gives life to an object. When a statue receives a name, it becomes a valid substitute to the king, takes his place and provides him a form of immortality.

The statues were therefore used in worship; they were intended to be placed in temples, and served to invoke the gods’ blessings upon the king—in particular, that they grant him a long life. Placing a statue of a person near that of a deity is a way of ensuring that the person pays perpetual homage to the deity. Through his statues, Gudea can pray eternally to the gods before whose statues his own are placed (several inscriptions saying that the statue "stands in constant prayer"), and also partake in the offerings made to them, for example libations in Statue B:

He (Gudea) installed the statue (in order) to convey messages. (...) It is (exclusively) of diorite; let is stand at the libation place. Nobody will forcibly (damage the stone).

The inscriptions describe, in varying degrees of detail, the process of the statue’s creation and its consecration, perhaps through a ritual intended to bring it to life (as is done for divine statues). Some of these inscriptions mention the establishment of food offerings, leading to the suggestion that the statues were the recipients of such offerings. However, this is not certain, since, as far as we know, Gudea was only worshipped after his death—and even then, this worship was not necessarily performed in the presence of his statues. They also served to preserve his memory because they would outlive him, or, according to a phrase in his inscriptions, so that his name might be “eternal” (gil-sa). The king’s name is sometimes inscribed separately from the main text of the inscriptions; its presence serves as a way to preserve the memory of the king, and the curses inscribed on the statues are directed at those who would erase his name and thus his memory.

== Degradations and re-installation ==
Gudea's statues have survived in a fragmented state. Many are beheaded, some heads have mutilated noses, and several headless figures that appear to have belonged to statues of Gudea have been identified. This has raised the question of whether these destructions were intentional or not. It is common for episodes of violence to be marked by the desecration of works of art, as a way to undermine the memory of a former king who had fallen from grace. This could have occurred during one of the conquests of the region, during the rise to power of the Third Dynasty of Ur or during its fall, or even later. But there is no conclusive evidence, particularly because it is impossible to date the destruction of any of these objects. Furthermore, these damages (or at least some of them) are not necessarily the result of human action, but could be due to the ravages of time or a natural disaster.

In the 3rd century BC, the site of Tello experienced a significant resettlement under the leadership of a Hellenized local ruler named Adad-nadin-ahhe, who built a palace on the Tell A. It was during the excavations of this building that archaeologists discovered the first statues of Gudea (statues A through H). Seven statues had been arranged in the building’s main courtyard (A), grouped according to the king’s posture (three statues of the seated king in the center, four of the standing king in a corner), along with fragments of statues. Those dedicated to Ningirsu were taken from nearby, as the palace was built on the site of this god’s former temple. The colossal statue (statue D), clearly too heavy to be transported, had been left where it was found, in a niche built specifically for it, and may have been slightly restored. Other statues, however, had been moved from other sanctuaries (Gatumdug, Ninhursag, Inanna). Adad-nadin-ahhe was, more broadly speaking, a sort of “antiquarian” interested in the history of the site where he was based; he also collected ancient cylinder seals and imitated the format of Gudea’s stamped bricks for his own building projects.

== Table of statues ==
Number	Image	Material	Size	Posture	Provenance	Dedicated to	Today at	Museum catalogue number
A		diorite	1.24m	standing	excavations E. de Sarzec, Telloh	Ninhursanga/Nintu	Louvre	AO 8
B		diorite	0.93m	sitting	excavations E. de Sarzec, Telloh	Ningirsu	Louvre	AO 2
C		diorite	1.40m	standing	excavations E. de Sarzec, Telloh	Inanna	Louvre	AO 5
D		diorite	1.58m	sitting	excavations E. de Sarzec, Telloh	Ningirsu	Louvre	AO 1
E		diorite	1.40m	standing	excavations E. de Sarzec, Telloh	Ba'u	Louvre	AO 6
F		diorite	0.86m	sitting	excavations E. de Sarzec, Telloh	Gatumdu	Louvre	AO 3
G		diorite	1.33m	standing	excavations E. de Sarzec, Telloh	Ningirsu	Louvre	AO 7
H		diorite	0.77m	sitting	excavations E. de Sarzec, Telloh	Ba'u	Louvre	AO 4
I		diorite	0.45m	sitting	excavations E. de Sarzec, Telloh	Ningishzida	Louvre	AO 3293 + AO 4108
J		diorite	--	--	excavations E. de Sarzec, Telloh	--	--	--
K		diorite	1.24m	standing	excavations E. de Sarzec, Telloh	Ningirsu	Louvre	AO 10
L		diorite	--	--	--	--	Louvre	AO 28
M		alabaster or paragonite	0.41m	standing	clandestine excavations, Telloh 1924	Geshtinanna	Detroit Institute of Arts	82.64
N		dolerite, calcite or steatite	0.62m	standing	clandestine excavations, Telloh 1924	Geshtinanna	Louvre	AO 22126
O		steatite	0.63m	standing	clandestine excavations, Telloh 1924	Geshtinanna	Ny Carlsberg Glyptotek, Copenhagen	NCG 840
P		diorite	0.44m	sitting	clandestine excavations, Telloh 1924	Ningishzida	New York, Metropolitan Museum of Art	59.2
Q		diorite	0.30m	sitting	clandestine excavations, Telloh 1924	Ningishzida	body in Baghdad, head in Philadelphia	body: IM 2909, head: CBS 16664
R		diorite	0.185m	sitting	art trade	Namhani (singer)	Harvard Museum of the Ancient Near East	HSM 8825
S		limestone	--	standing	--	--	Ancient Orient Museum, Istanbul (and fragments in the Louvre)	EŞEM 5215
T		dolerite	head: 0.65x0.55m	--	Nippur	Nisaba	Golenishev collection (body); Penn Museum (head)	5144,1.5 (body) + UM L.29.212 (head)
U		dolerite	1.01m	standing	Tell Hammam	Nanshe	British Museum	92988
V		diorite	0.736m	standing	art trade	--	British Museum	122910
W		diorite	0.16x0.11m	neck fragment		--	Louvre	AO 20
X	Limestone statue of Gudea. From Girsu, Iraq. 2144–2124 BC. Extensively reconstructed. Ancient Orient Museum, Istanbul	diorite	--	fragment	--	Meslamta-ea	Louvre	AO 26646
Y		limestone	--	fragment	--	Ningirsu	Louvre	AO 26633
Z		diorite	--	fragment	--	--	Louvre	AO 26637
AA		limestone	--	fragment (stele?)	--	--	Louvre	AO 26630
BB		limestone	--	fragments (stele?)	--	Ba'u	Louvre	AO 26635 + AO 26670
--		diorite	1.07m	standing	--	--	Louvre (Abu Dhabi)	AO 20164
--		diorite	0.7m	standing	--	--	Louvre (Lens)	AO 29155

== Bibliography ==
- Aruz, Joan, ed. (2003). Art of the First Cities: The Third Millennium B.C. from the Mediterranean to the Indus. New York: Metropolitan Museum of Art. pp. 417–440.
- Bahrani, Zainab (2017). "Gudea: Royal Portraits and the Lifespan of Images". Mesopotamia: Ancient Art and Architecture. London: Thames & Hudson. pp. 135–153.
- Benoit, Agnès (2003). Art et archéologie : les civilisations du Proche-Orient ancien. Manuels de l'école du Louvre (in French). Paris: RMN.
- Edzard, Dietz Otto (1997). Gudea and his dynasty. Toronto: University of Toronto Press. ISBN 978-0-8020-4187-6.
- Suter, Claudia E. (2000). Gudea's Temple Building: The Representation of an Early Mesopotamian Ruler in Text and Image (Cuneiform Monographs, 17). Brill. ISBN 978-90-5693-035-6.
- Suter, Claudia E. (2012). "Gudea of Lagash: Iconoclasm or Tooth of Time?". In May, Natalie N. (ed.). Iconoclasm and Text Destruction in the Ancient Near East. Chicago: The Oriental Institute of the University of Chicago. pp. 57–87.
- Suter, Claudia E. (2015). "Gudea's Kingship and Divinity". In Yonah, Shamir; Greenstein, Edward L.; Gruber, Mayer I.; Machinist, Peter; Paul, Shalom M. (ed.). Marbeh Ḥokmah: Studies in the Bible and the Ancient Near East in Loving Memory of Victor Avigdor Hurowitz. Winona Lake: Eisenbrauns. pp. 499–523.
- Winter, Irene J. (2010) [1989]. "The Body of the Able Ruler: Toward an understanding of the statues of Gudea". On the art in the ancient Near East, Volume II: From the Third Millennium B.C.E. Leyde and Boston: Brill. pp. 152–165.

=== Further reading ===
- Vogel, Helga (2000). "Statuen, die sichtbar machen. Zur ästhetischen, religiösen und politischen Bedeutung der Statuen des Gudea". Baghdader Mitteilungen (in German). 31: 65–86.
- F. Johansen, "Statues of Gudea, ancient and modern". Mesopotamia 6, 1978.
- Parrot, André (1948). Tello, vingt campagnes des fouilles (1877-1933) (in French). Paris: Albin Michel.
- Steible, Horst (1994). "Versuch einer Chronologie der Statuen des Gudea von Lagaš". Mitteilungen der Deutschen Orient-Gesellschaft (in German). 126: 81–104.
