= Kindazi =

Sumerian god

Kindazi 𒀭𒃱𒍣
- Divine Barber
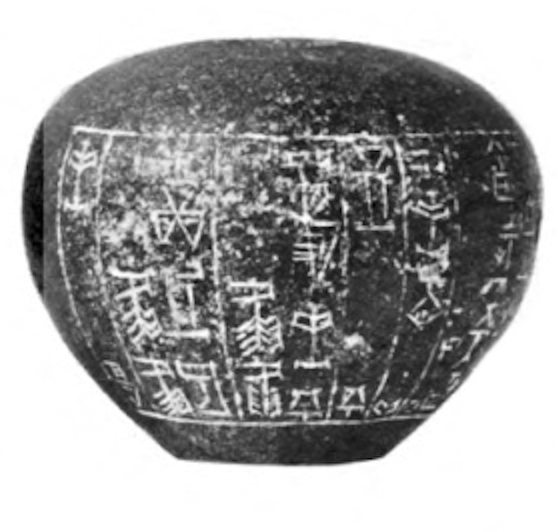
- Macehead dedicated to Kindazi by Queen Nin-kagina for Nam-mahani, British Museum, BM 22445

Kindazi was wordshipped in Lagash

Kindazi (Sumerian: 𒀭𒃱𒍣, ^{d}kinda2-zi) was a minor Sumerian god. He was a "divine barber" and an acolyte of god Ningirsu.

He is known from inscriptions, such as a macehead dedicated by queen Ninkagina for the life of King Nam-mahani of Lagash:

𒀭𒃱𒍣 / 𒈗𒀀𒉌 / 𒉆𒋾 / 𒉆𒈤𒉌 / 𒑐𒋼𒋛 / 𒉢𒁓𒆷𒆠𒂠 / 𒎏𒅎𒄀𒈾 / 𒌉𒅗𒆬𒆤 / 𒅇𒉆𒋾𒆷𒉌𒂠 / 𒀀𒈬𒈾𒊒 /𒅆𒁕𒁀 / 𒈗𒈬𒁀𒍣𒄀 / 𒃶𒈠𒁕𒍣𒍣 / 𒈬𒁉

^{d}kinda2-zi / lugal-a-ni / nam-ti / nam-mah-ni / ensi2 / lagash^{KI}-ka-she3 / nin-inim-gi-na / dumu ka-ku3-ke4 / u3 nam-ti-la-ni-she3 / a mu-na-ru / shita2-ba / lugal-mu ba-zi-ge / he2-ma-da-zi-zi / mu-bi

"To Kindazi, her king. Nin-kagina, daughter of Kaku, donated this on account of the life of Nammahani, ruler of Lagash, and also for her life"

— Inscription of Nin-kagina for the life of Nam-mahani

He also appears in various other inscriptions, such as the Gudea cylinders.
