= Ur-gar =

Ur-gar 𒌨𒃻

King of Lagash
- Reign: c. 2119 – c. 2113 BC
- Predecessor: Ur-Ningirsu II
- Successor: Nam-mahani
- Died: c. 2113 BC

Location of Lagash

Ur-gar or Ur-nig (Sumerian: 𒌨𒃻; died c. 2113 BC) was the last ensi of Lagash, roughly contemporaneous with the last king of Akkad, Shu-turul.

Ur-gar was a son-in-law of Ur-Baba, and succeeded Ur-Ningirsu II Several votive inscriptions are known of him. He was succeeded by the last ruler of the Second Dynasty of Lagash, Nam-mahani.

Only one of his year names is known:

mu ur-gar ensi2
“Year: Ur-gar is governor”

— Only known year name of Ur-gar.

Queen Nininimgina is also known for a dedication to him:

To Šulšagana, the beloved son of Ningirsu, her master, for the life of Ur-nig, ruler of Lagaš, Nininimgina, the daughter of Kaku, his wife, also for her own life, she dedicated it (this mace head) to him.

— Macehead dedication of Queen Nininimgina, for the life of Ur-gar

Regnal titles
Preceded by Ur-Ningirsu II	King of Lagash c. 2119 – c. 2113 BC	Succeeded by Nam-mahani
