= Nam-mahani =

Nam-mahani 𒉆𒈤𒉌

King of Lagash
- Reign: c. 2113 – c. 2110 BC
- Predecessor: Ur-gar
- Successor: Position abolished
- Died: c. 2110 BC

Location of Lagash

Nam-mahani (Sumerian: 𒉆𒈤𒉌, nam-maḫ-ni; died c. 2110 BC) was a Sumerian ruler, and the last ensi of Lagash, roughly contemporaneous with the last king of Akkad, Shu-turul. His reign was followed by that of Utu-hengal, who destroyed the power of the Gutian Dynasty, and put an end to the power of the various city-states, reunifying the Sumerian realm.

== Inscriptions ==
Nam-mahani is known from various inscriptions, and especially a macehead dedicated by queen Nininimgina and bearing the name of King Nam-Mahani, to god Kindazi:

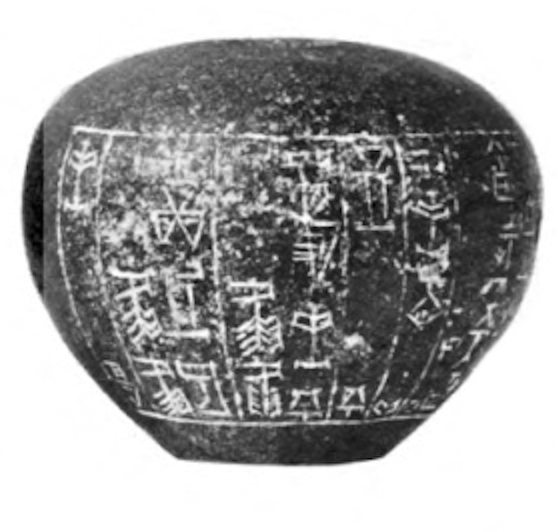
Macehead dedicated by Queen Nininimgina for Nam-Mahani, British Museum, BM 22445

𒀭𒃱𒍣 / 𒈗𒀀𒉌 / 𒉆𒋾 / 𒉆𒈤𒉌 / 𒑐𒋼𒋛 / 𒉢𒁓𒆷𒆠𒂠 / 𒎏𒅎𒄀𒈾 / 𒌉𒅗𒆬𒆤 / 𒅇𒉆𒋾𒆷𒉌𒂠 / 𒀀𒈬𒈾𒊒 /𒅆𒁕𒁀 / 𒈗𒈬𒁀𒍣𒄀 / 𒃶𒈠𒁕𒍣𒍣 / 𒈬𒁉

^{d}kinda2-zi / lugal-a-ni / nam-ti / nam-mah-ni / ensi2 / lagash^{KI}-ka-she3 / nin-inim-gi-na / dumu ka-ku3-ke4 / u3 nam-ti-la-ni-she3 / a mu-na-ru / shita2-ba / lugal-mu ba-zi-ge / he2-ma-da-zi-zi / mu-bi

"To Kindazi, her king. Nininimgina, daughter of Kaku, donated this on account of the life of Nammahani, ruler of Lagash, and also for her life"

— Inscription of Nininimgina for the life of Nam-mahani

== Other objects ==
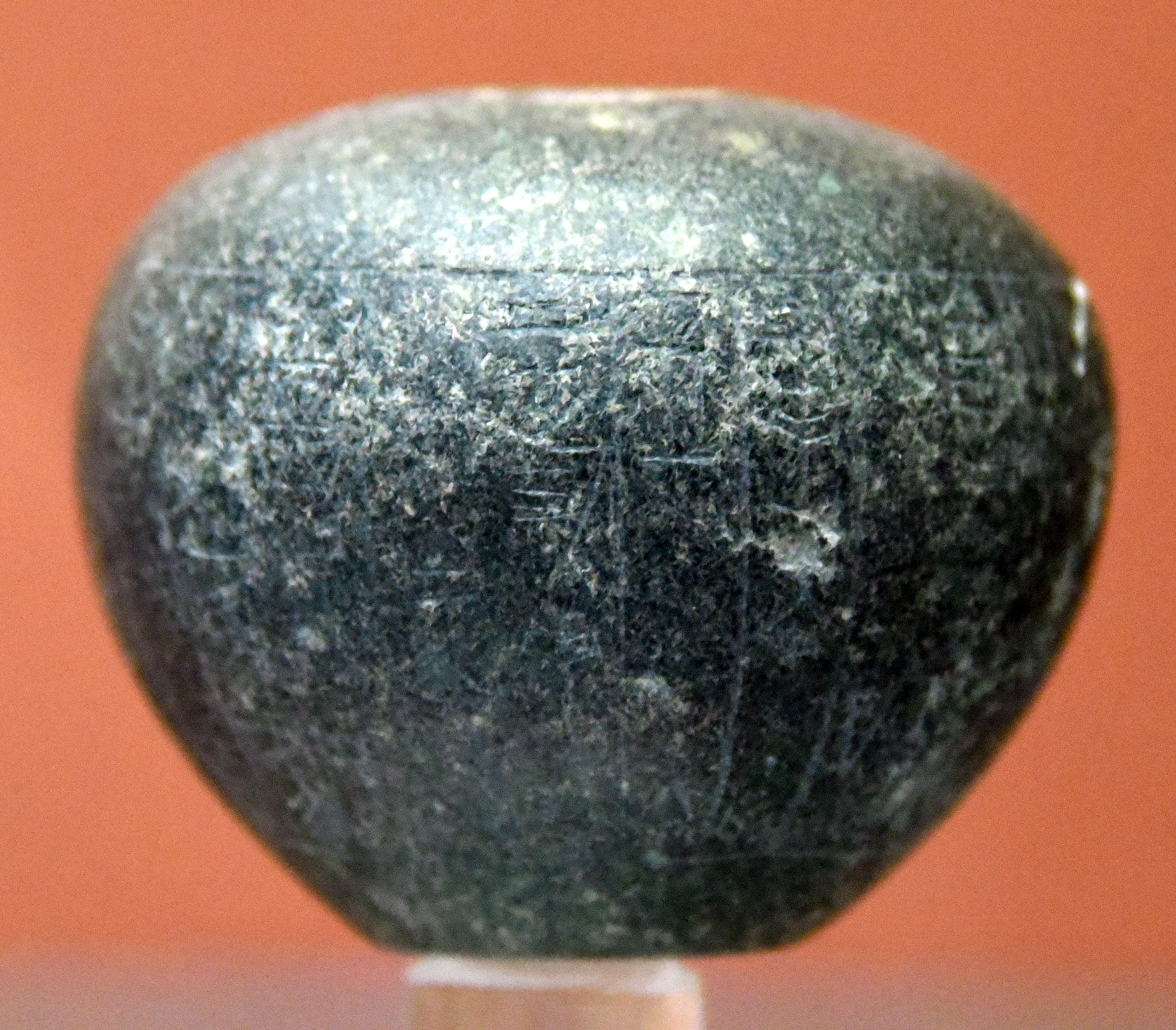
The votive macehead in the name of King Nam-Mahani and Queen Ninkagina of Lagash, dedicated to god Kindazi, circa 2100 BC. British Museum.

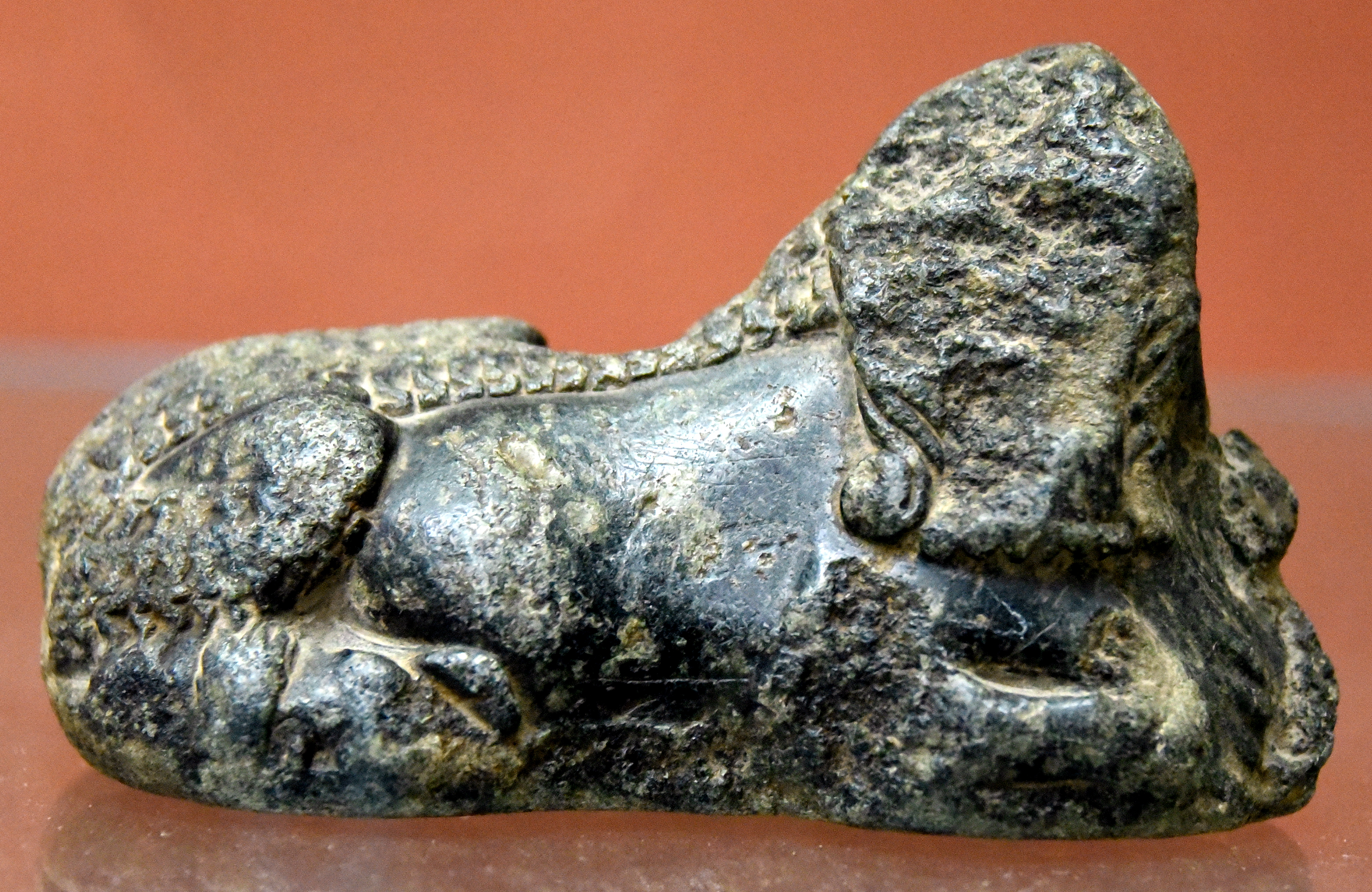
Human-headed bull in the name of King Nam-Mahani of Lagash, dedicated to Nanshe, circa 2100 BC. British Museum.

Regnal titles
Preceded by Ur-gar	King of Lagash c. 2113 – c. 2110 BC	Succeeded by Position abolished
