= Ur-Ningirsu =

Ur-Ningirsu 𒌨𒀭𒎏𒄈𒋢
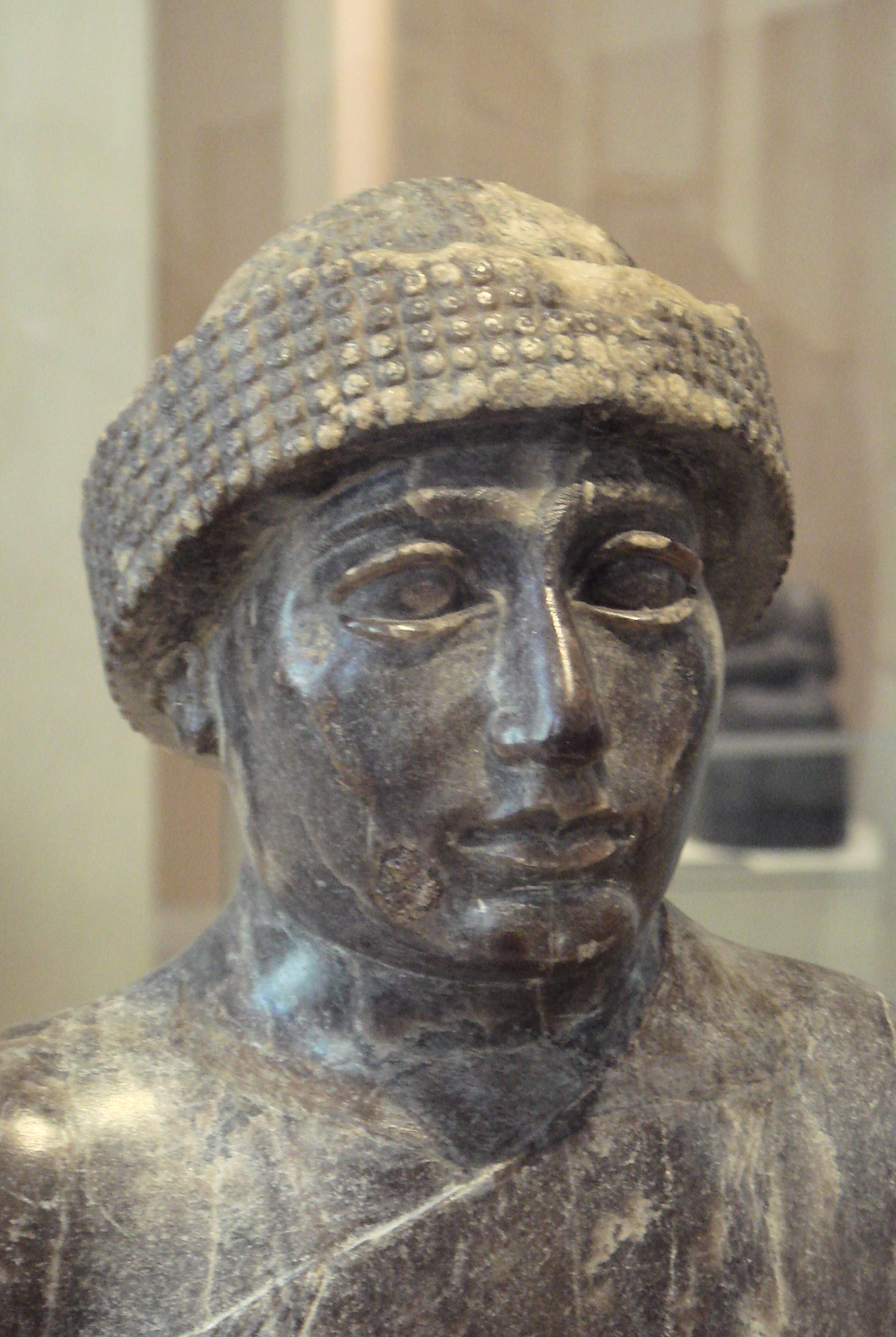
- Statue of Ur-Ningirsu, prince of Lagash. AO 9504 Louvre Museum.

King of Lagash
- Reign: c. 2124 – c. 2119 BC
- Predecessor: Gudea
- Successor: Ur-gar
- Died: c. 2119 BC
- Father: Gudea

Location of Lagash

Ur-Ningirsu (Sumerian: 𒌨𒀭𒎏𒄈𒋢, Ur-^{D}-nin-gir-su; died c. 2119 BC) also Ur-Ningirsu II in contrast with the earlier Ur-Ningirsu I, was a Sumerian ruler (ensi) of the state of Lagash in Southern Mesopotamia who ruled c. 2120 BC. He was the son of the previous ruler of Lagash named Gudea.

== Statue of Ur-Ningirsu ==
A statue of Ur-Ningirsu, dedicated to Ningishzida (Sumerian: 𒀭𒎏𒄑𒍣𒁕, ^{D}Nin-ḡiš-zi-da), is shared by The Metropolitan Museum of Art of New York, and the Musée du Louvre, as they own separately the head and the body of the statue, respectively. The statue has an inscription in the back, which reads:

"For Ningišzida, his (personal) god, Ur-Ningirsu, ruler of Lagash, son of Gudea, ruler of Lagash, who built Ningirsu’s Eninnu, fashioned his (own) statue. I am the one beloved of his (personal) god; let my life be long - (this is how) he named that statue for his (Ningirsu’s) sake, and he brought it to him into his House"

— Inscription of Statue A of Ur-Ningirsu. AO 9504 Louvre Museum.

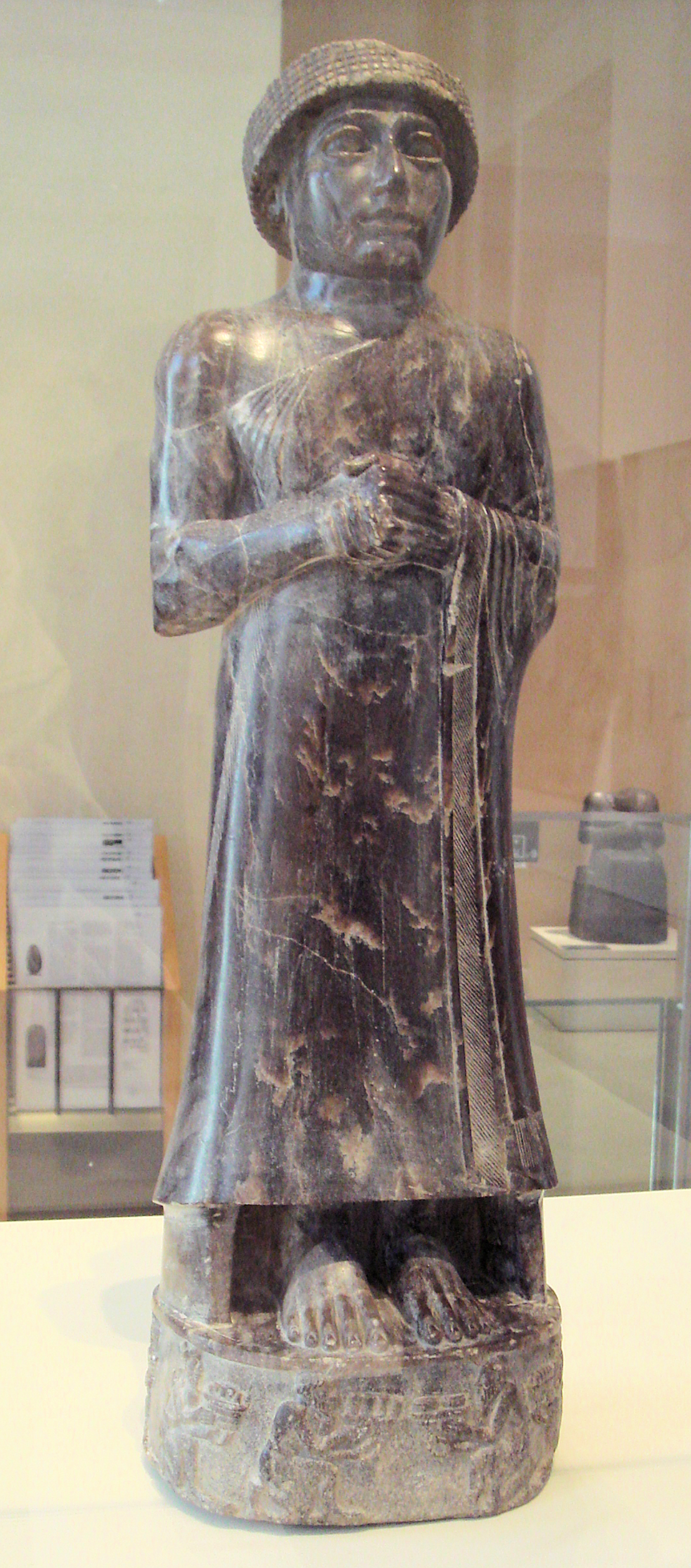
Statue of Ur-Ningirsu, Louvre Museum

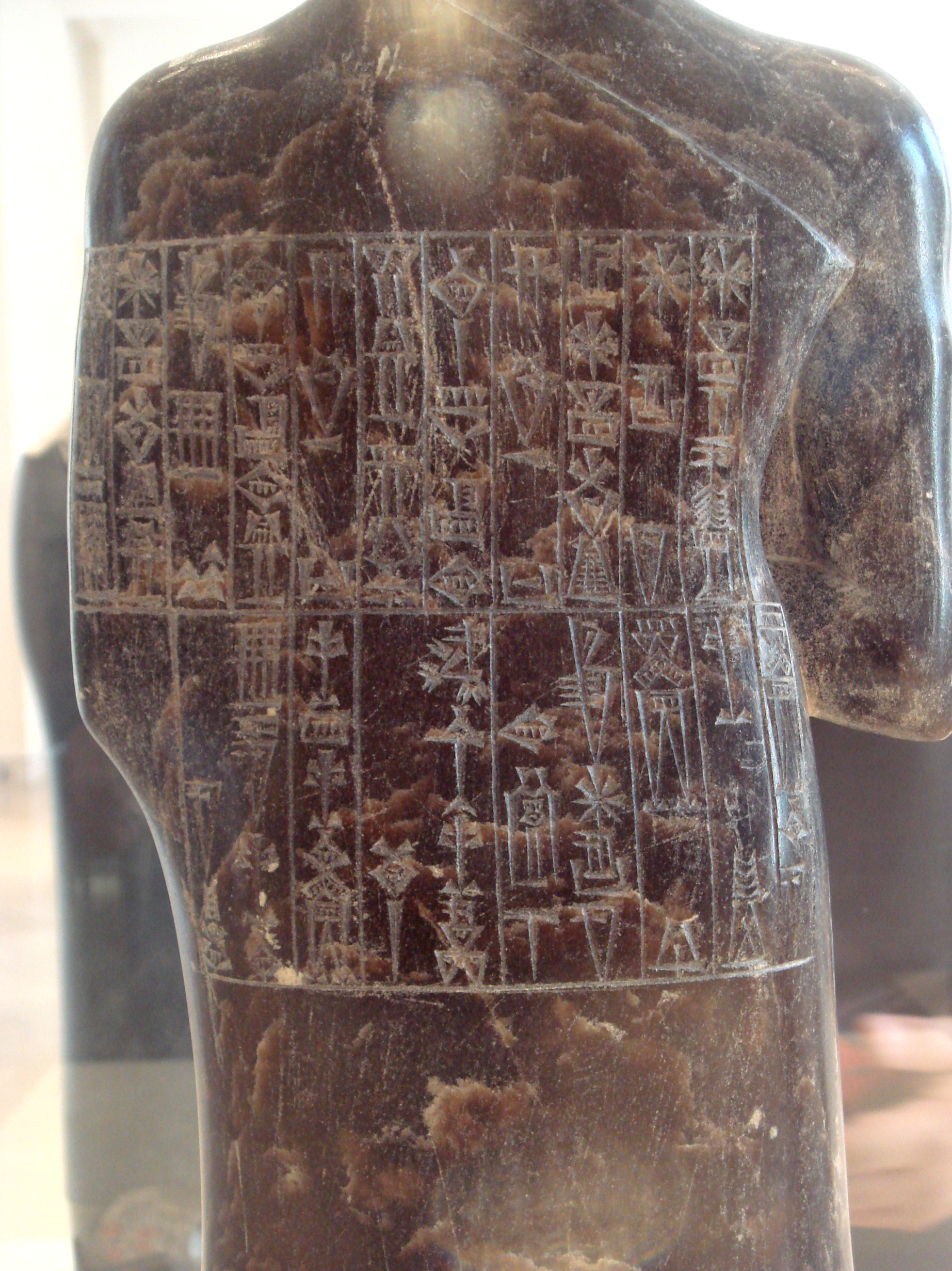
Inscription on the back of the statue

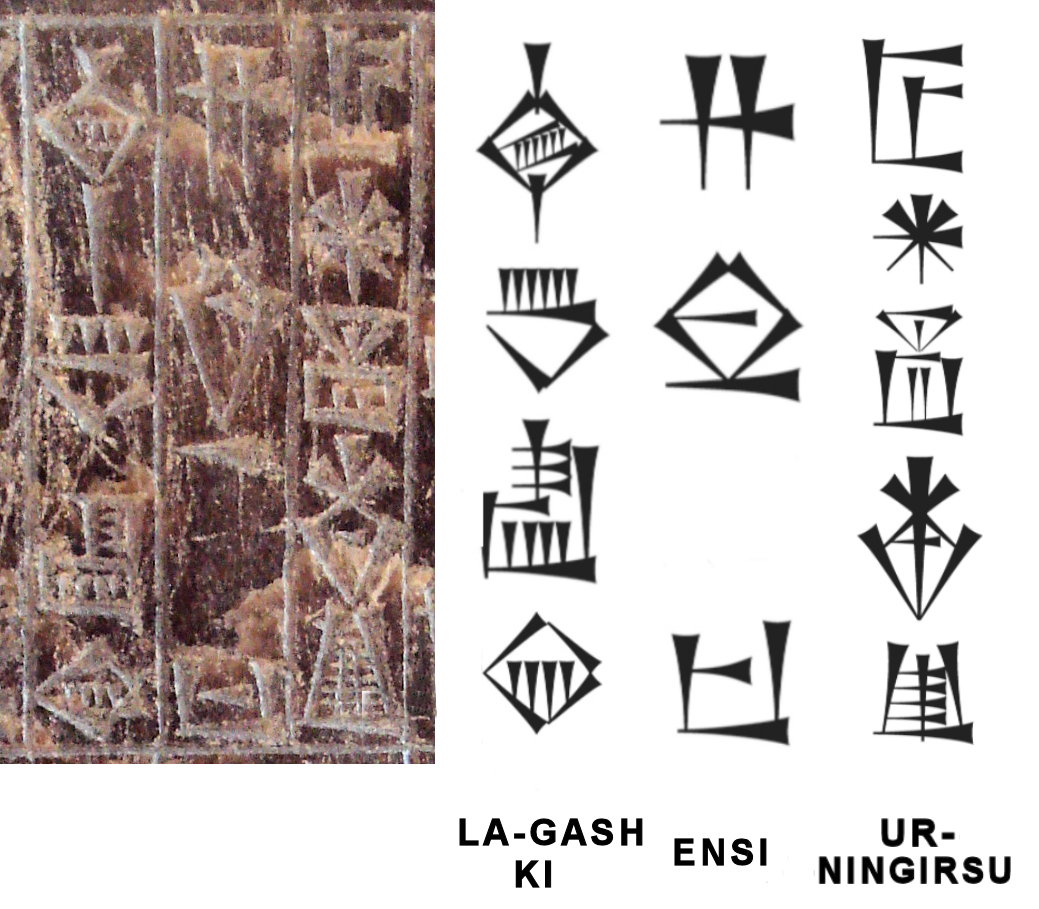
Ur-Ningirsu Ensi Lagashki, "Ur-Ningirsu, Governor of Lagash" on his statue

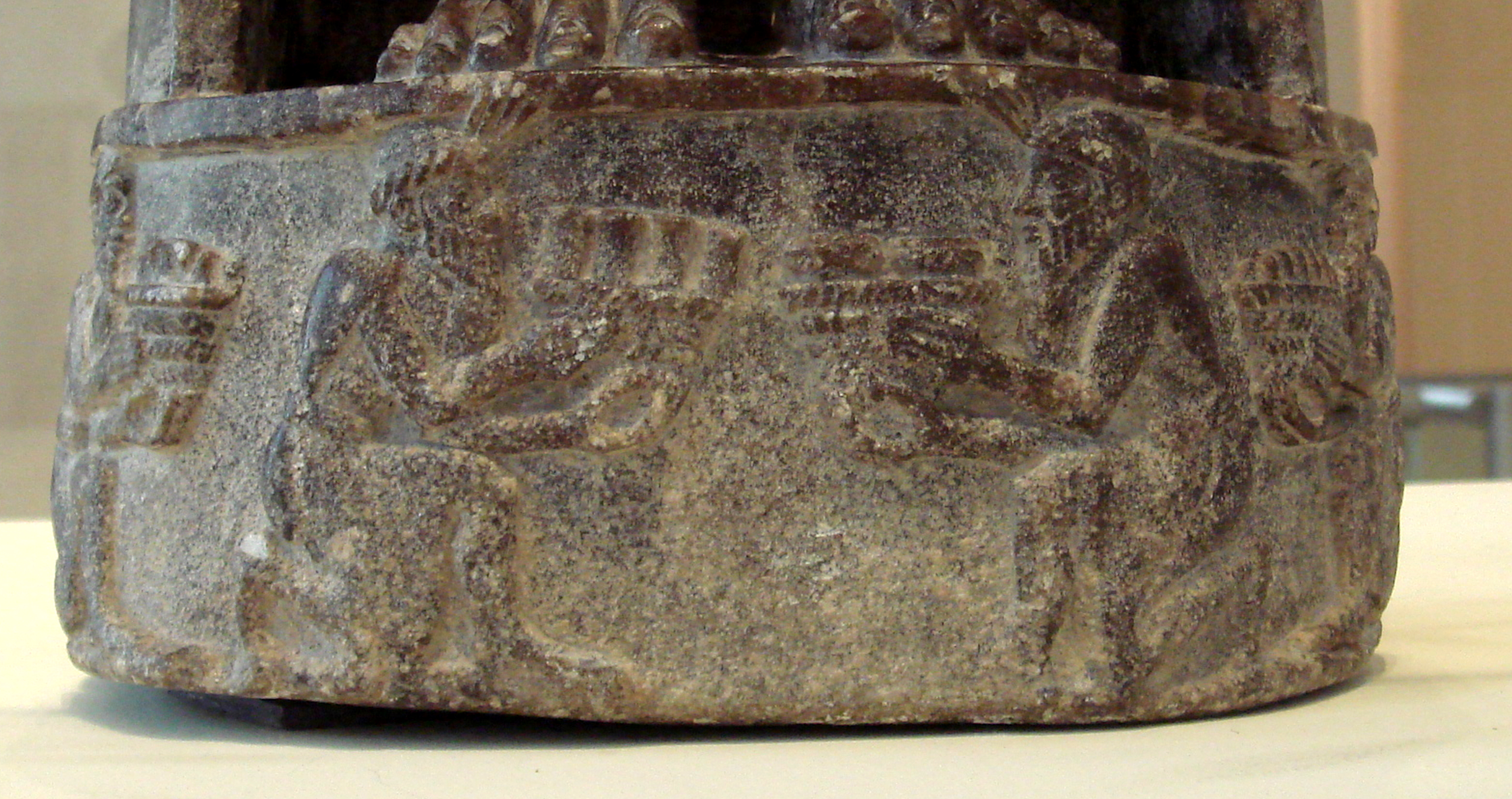
Tribute bearers (base of the statue)

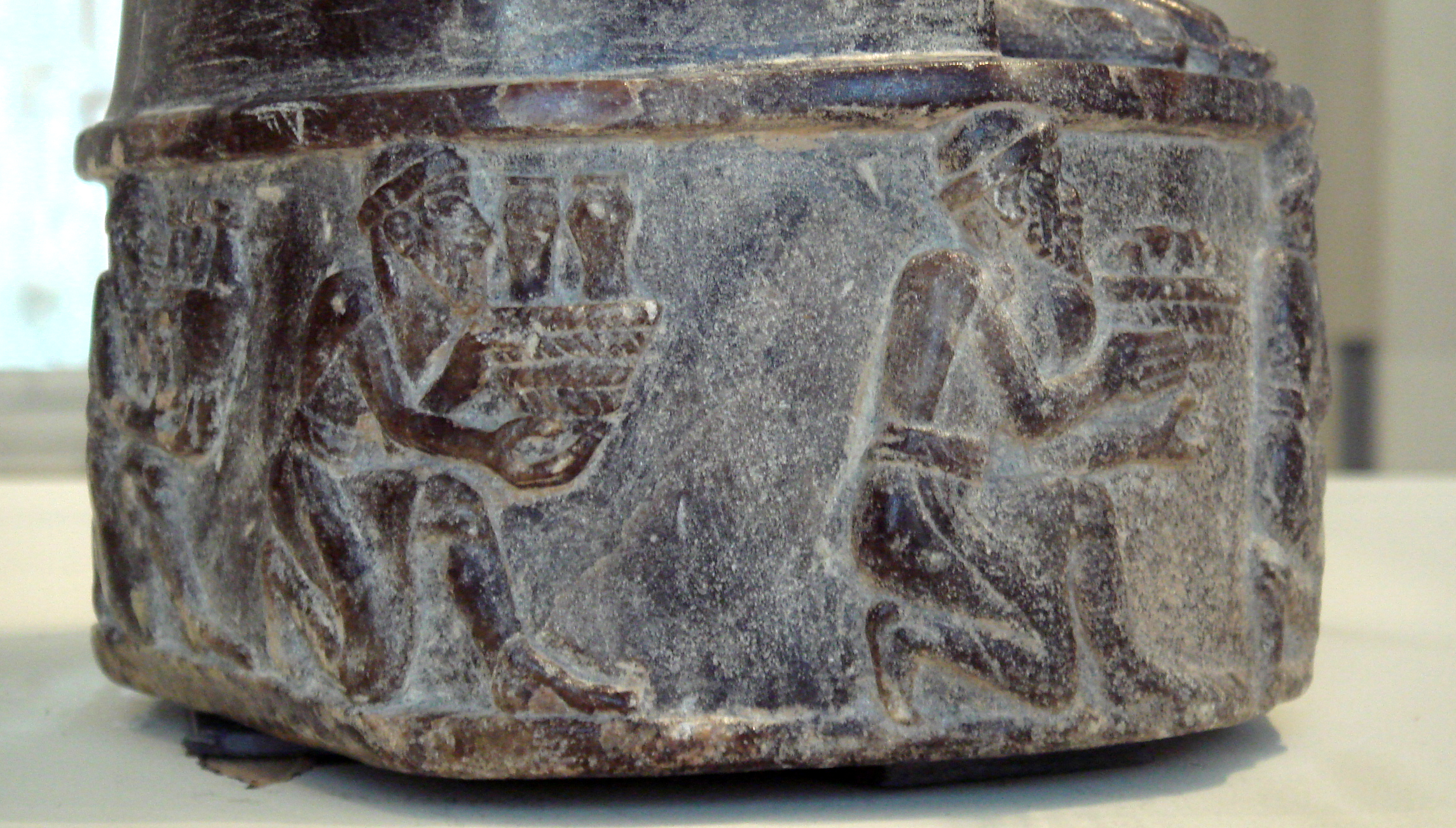
Tribute bearers (right side of the statue)

== Other objects and inscriptions ==
Also found was a foundation cone describing Ur-Ningirsu's construction of several temples.

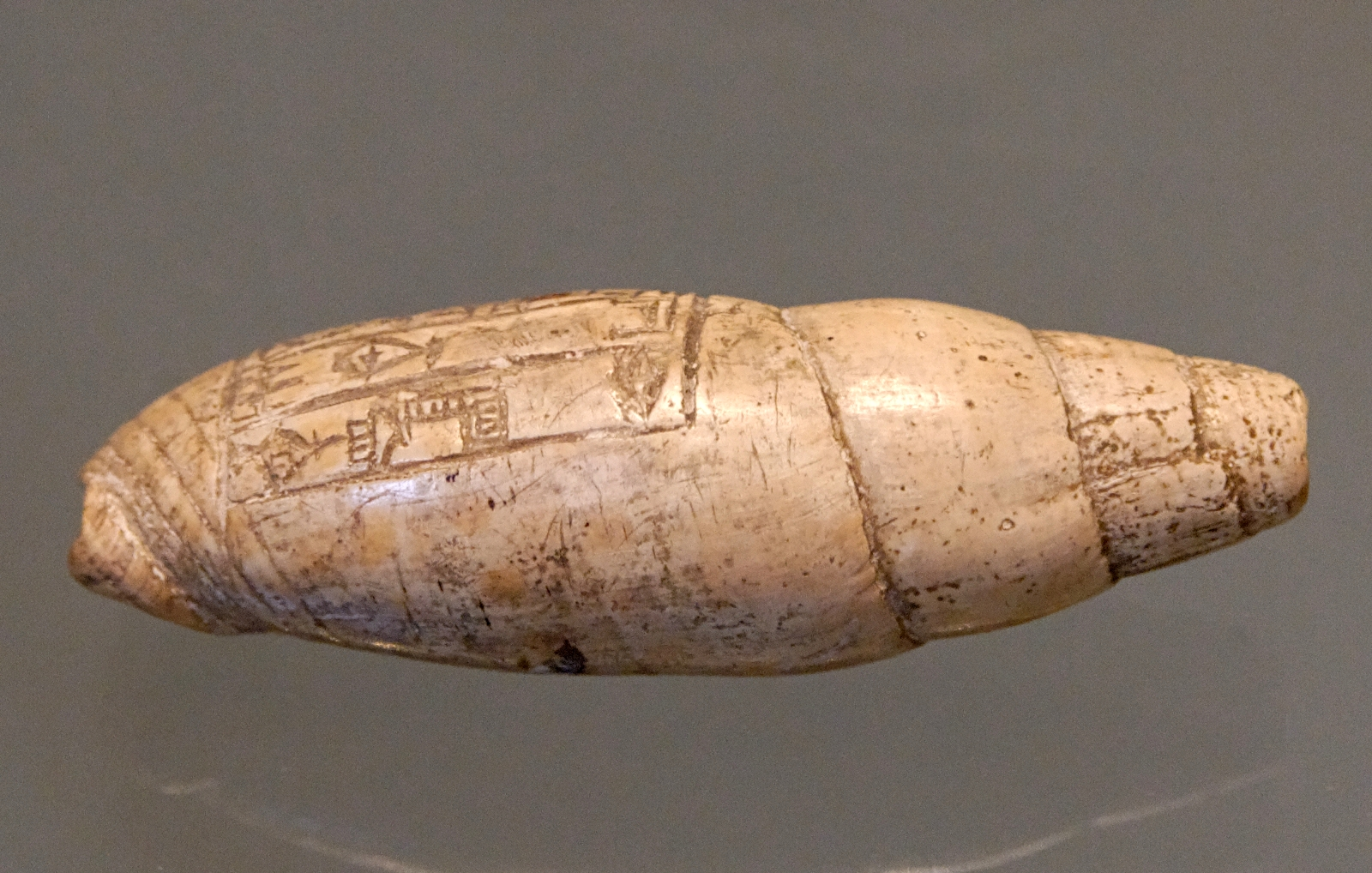
Inscribed shell bearing the name of Ur-Ningirsu. Louvre Museum.

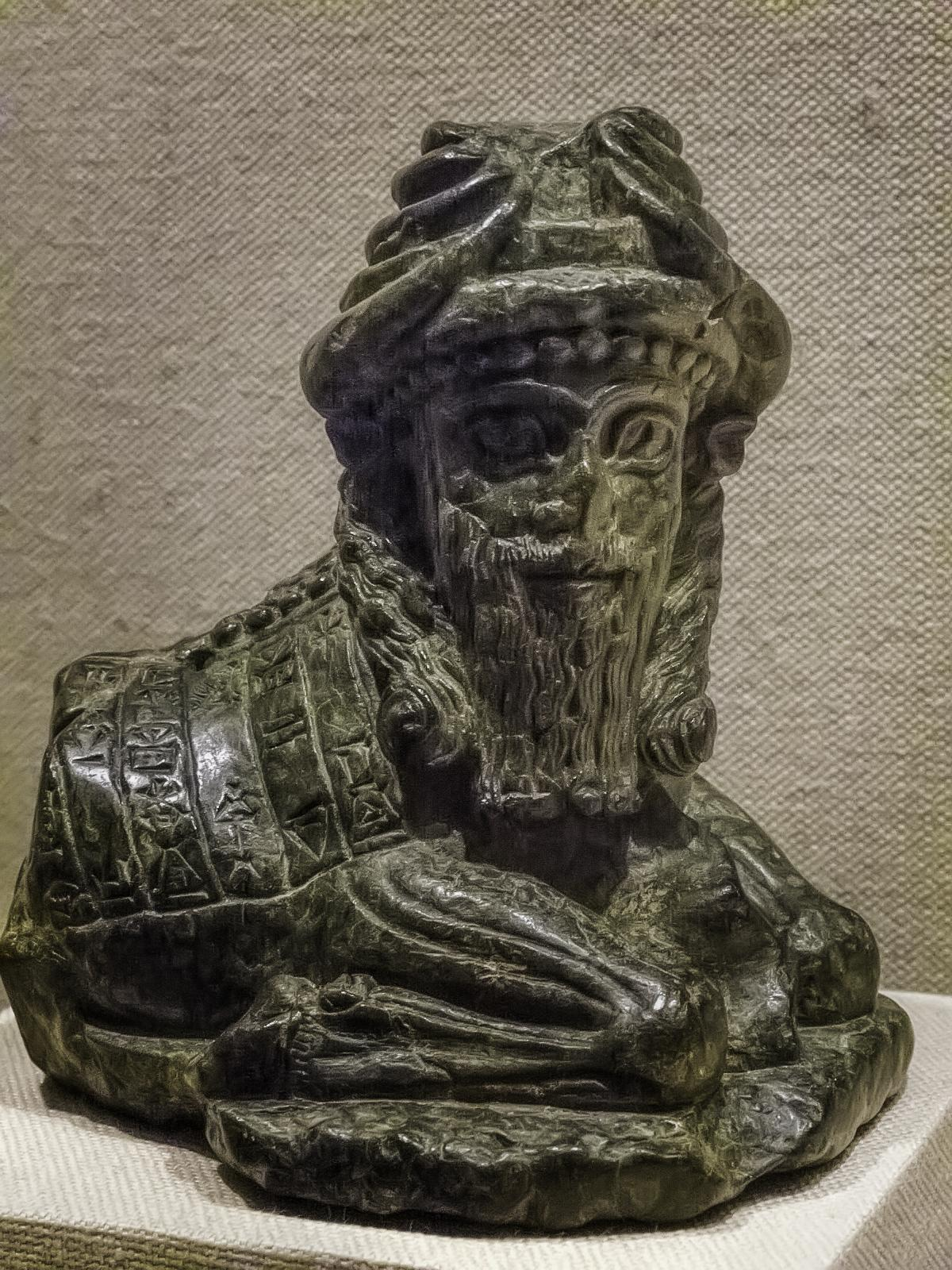
Kursarikku associated with the sun god Shamash. The inscription mentions goddess Nanshe and is dedicated to "Ur-Ningirsu, ensi of Lagash". Metropolitan Museum of Art 1996.353

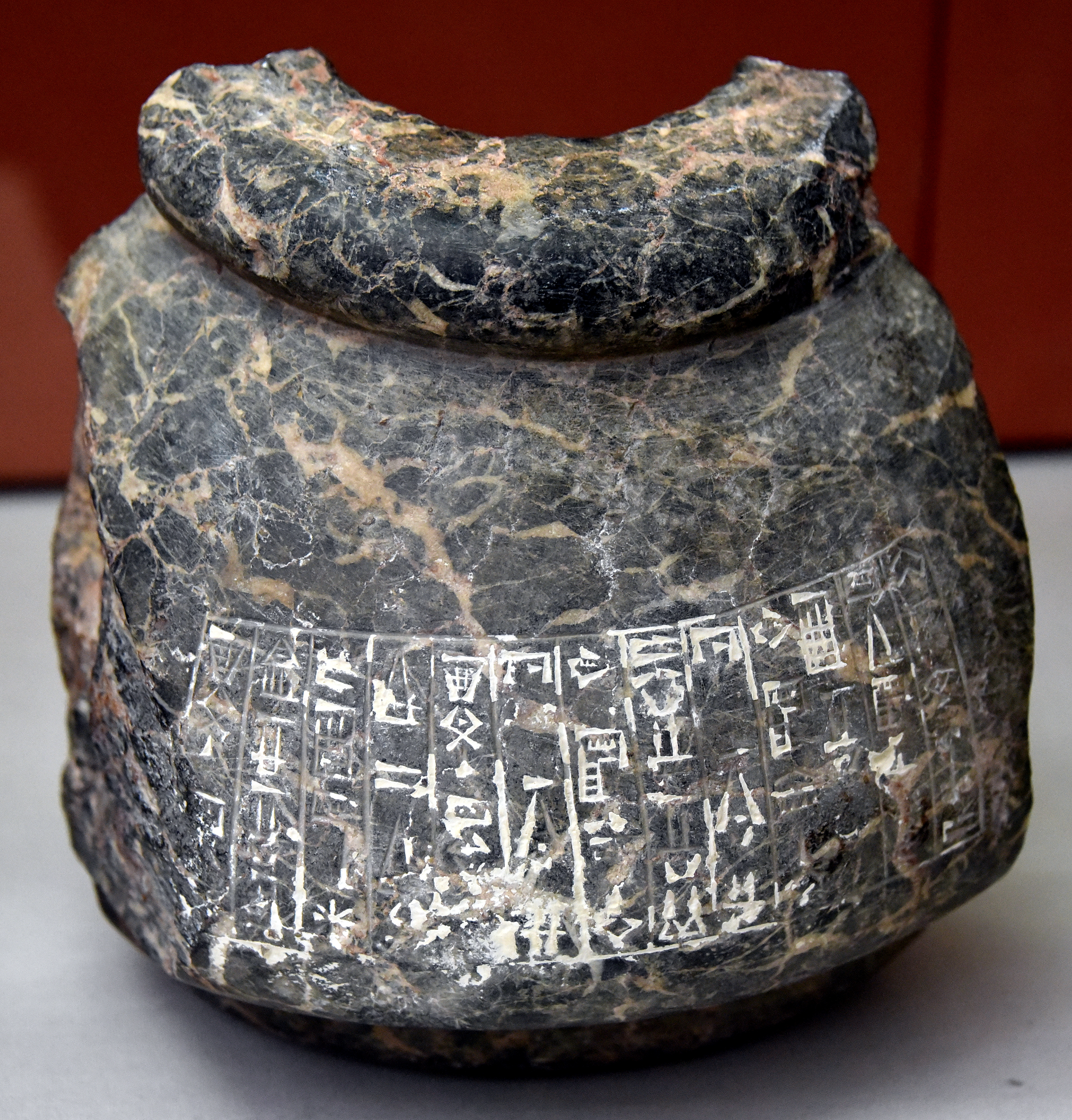
Votive macehead in the name of Ur-Ningirsu (inscription upside down). British Museum, BM 86917.

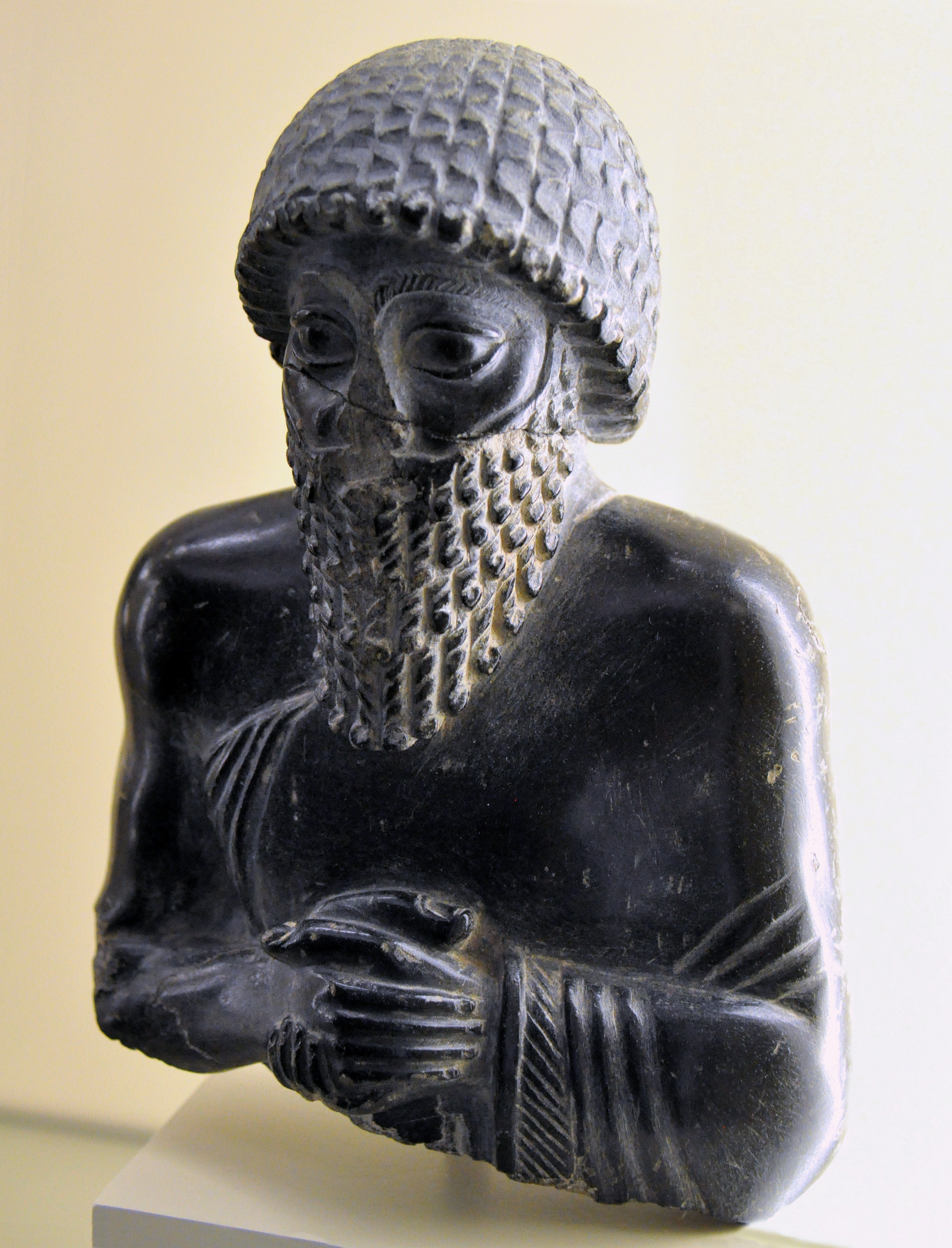
Another statue of Ur-Ningirsu, with the inscription ""For Ningišzida, his (personal) god, Ur-Ningirsu, ruler of Laagaš, son of Gudea, ruler of Lagaš... (broken)"

== Sources ==
- Dijk-Coombes, Renate Marian van. Portrait of a Ruler: The Portrayal of Ur-Ningirsu in Statuary and Inscriptions. pp. 358–381.
- "Ur-Ningirsu in the Metropolitan Museum of Art". www.metmuseum.org.

Regnal titles
Preceded by Gudea	King of Lagash c. 2124 – c. 2119 BC	Succeeded by Ur-gar
