= Pirig-me =

Pirig-me 𒊊𒈨

King of Lagash
- Reign: c. 2180 BC
- Predecessor: Ur-Ningirsu I
- Successor: Lu-baba
- Died: c. 2180 BC
- Father: Ur-Ningirsu I

Location of Lagash

Pirig-me (Sumerian: 𒊊𒈨, Pirig-me; died c. 2180 BC), was a Sumerian ruler (ensi) of the state of Lagash in Southern Mesopotamia. He was the son of Ur-Ningirsu I.

Pirig-me is only known from one inscription and from one year name:

"Year the en (priest) of Ningin was installed"

— Year names of Pirig-me.

The inscription on a brick reads:

"For Ningirsu, Enlil's mighty warrior,
Pirig-me, ruler of Lagash, son of Ur-Ningirsu, ruler of Lagash, chosen in the heart of Nanshe, named by Ningirsu, child born of Ninsun,
(...)
constructed a weir at the Ursag-ani canal."

— Inscription of Pirig-me.

His was succeeded by Lu-baba.

Regnal titles
Preceded by Ur-Ningirsu I	King of Lagash c. 2185 BC	Succeeded by Lu-baba
