= Ur-Ningirsu I =

Ur-Ningirsu 𒌨𒀭𒎏𒄈𒍪

King of Lagash
- Reign: c. 2185 BC
- Successor: Pirig-me
- Died: c. 2185 BC
- Issue: Pirig-me
- Dynasty: 2nd Dynasty of Lagash

Location of Lagash

Ur-Ningirsu I (Sumerian: 𒌨𒀭𒎏𒄈𒍪, Ur-^{D}-nin-gir-su; died c. 2185 BC), was a Sumerian ruler (ensi) of the state of Lagash in Southern Mesopotamia. He is much less known and documented than Ur-Ningirsu II, generally just called Ur-Ningirsu.

The existence of Ur-Ningirsu I was proved by an inscription in the British Museum (an offering list, referenced BM 18474), in which he is called "Ur-Ningirsu the elder" (Ur-^{D}-nin-gir-su gu-la), and is contrasted a few lines later by another ruler described as "Ur-Ningirsu, son of Gudea". He would be the son of Ur-Nin-MAR.KI according to the Lagash King List.

Ur-Ningirsu I is also known by a few year names:

1. "Year: Ur-Ningirsu became ruler"
2. "Year: Ur-Ningirsu became ruler, following year"
a. "Year: The š. (priest), found by means of a sacrificial animal" b. "Year: The l. (priest) of Bau, found by means of a sacrificial animal" c. "Year: The i. (priest) of Ningirsu, found by means of a sacrificial animal"

— Year names of Ur-Ningirsu I.

His son was Pirig-me.

Regnal titles
Preceded by	King of Lagash c. 2185 BC	Succeeded by Pirig-me
