= Lagash =

Ancient Mesopotamian city state

- 𒉢𒁓𒆷𒆠
- Al-Hiba
- Location within Iraq
- 31°24′41″N 46°24′26″E
- Type: Settlement
- Periods: Early Dynastic, Sargonic, Ur III
- Location: Al-Shatrah, Dhi Qar Governorate, Iraq
- Region: Mesopotamia

History
- Built: 3rd millennium BC

Site notes
- Area: 400 to 600 ha
- Excavation dates: 1887, 1968–1976, 1990, 2019–present
- Archaeologists: Robert Koldewey, Vaughn E. Crawford, Donald P. Hansen

Lagash (/ˈleɪ.ɡæʃ/; cuneiform: 𒉢𒁓𒆷𒆠 LAGAŠ^{KI}; Sumerian: Lagaš) was an ancient city-state located northwest of the junction of the Euphrates and Tigris rivers and east of Uruk, about 22 kilometres (14 mi) east of the modern town of Al-Shatrah, Iraq. Lagash (modern Al-Hiba in Dhi Qar Governorate) was one of the oldest cities of the Ancient Near East, and the Lagash state incorporated the cities of Lagash, Girsu, and Nina. Girsu (modern Telloh), about 25 km (16 mi) northwest of Lagash, was the religious center of the Lagash state, with its main temple, the E-ninnu, dedicated to the god Ningirsu. The ancient site of Nina (Tell Zurghul), around 10 km (6.2 mi) away, marks the southern limit of the state.

== History ==
Though some Uruk period pottery shards were found in a surface survey, significant occupation at the site of Lagash began early in the 3rd Millennium BC, in the Early Dynastic I period (c. 2900–2600 BC). Surface surveys and excavations show that the peak occupation, with an area of about 500 hectares occurred during the Early Dynastic III period (c. 2500–2334 BC). The later corresponds with what is now called the First Dynasty of Lagash. Lagash then came under the control of the Akkadian Empire for several centuries. With the fall of that empire, Lagash had a period of revival as an independent power during the 2nd Dynasty of Lagash before coming under the control of the 3rd Dynasty of Ur. After the fall of Ur, there was some modest occupation in the Isin-Larsa and Old Babylonian periods. Lagash was then largely deserted until a Seleucid era fortress was built there in the 2nd century BC.

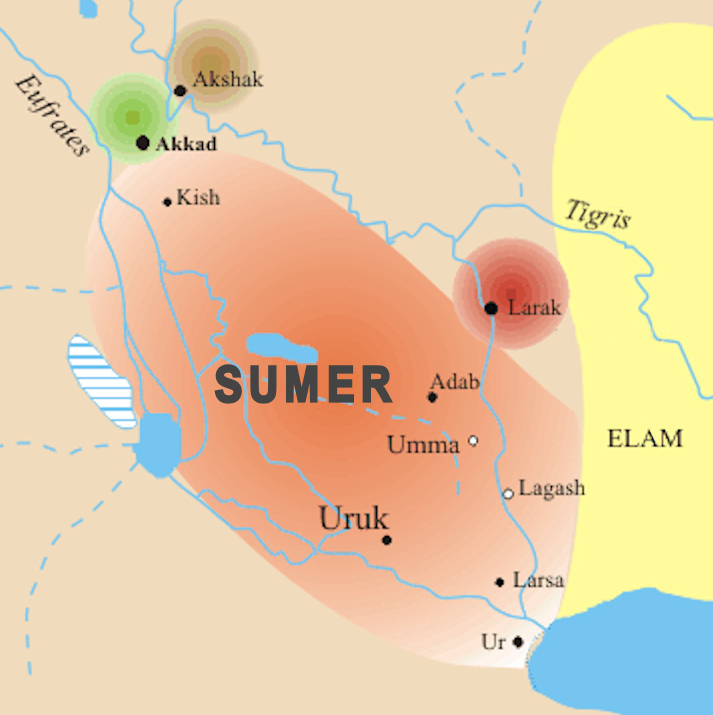
Location of Lagash before the expansion of the Akkadian Empire (in green). The territory of Sumer appears in orange. Circa 2350 BC

=== First dynasty of Lagash (c. 2520 – c. 2260 BC) ===
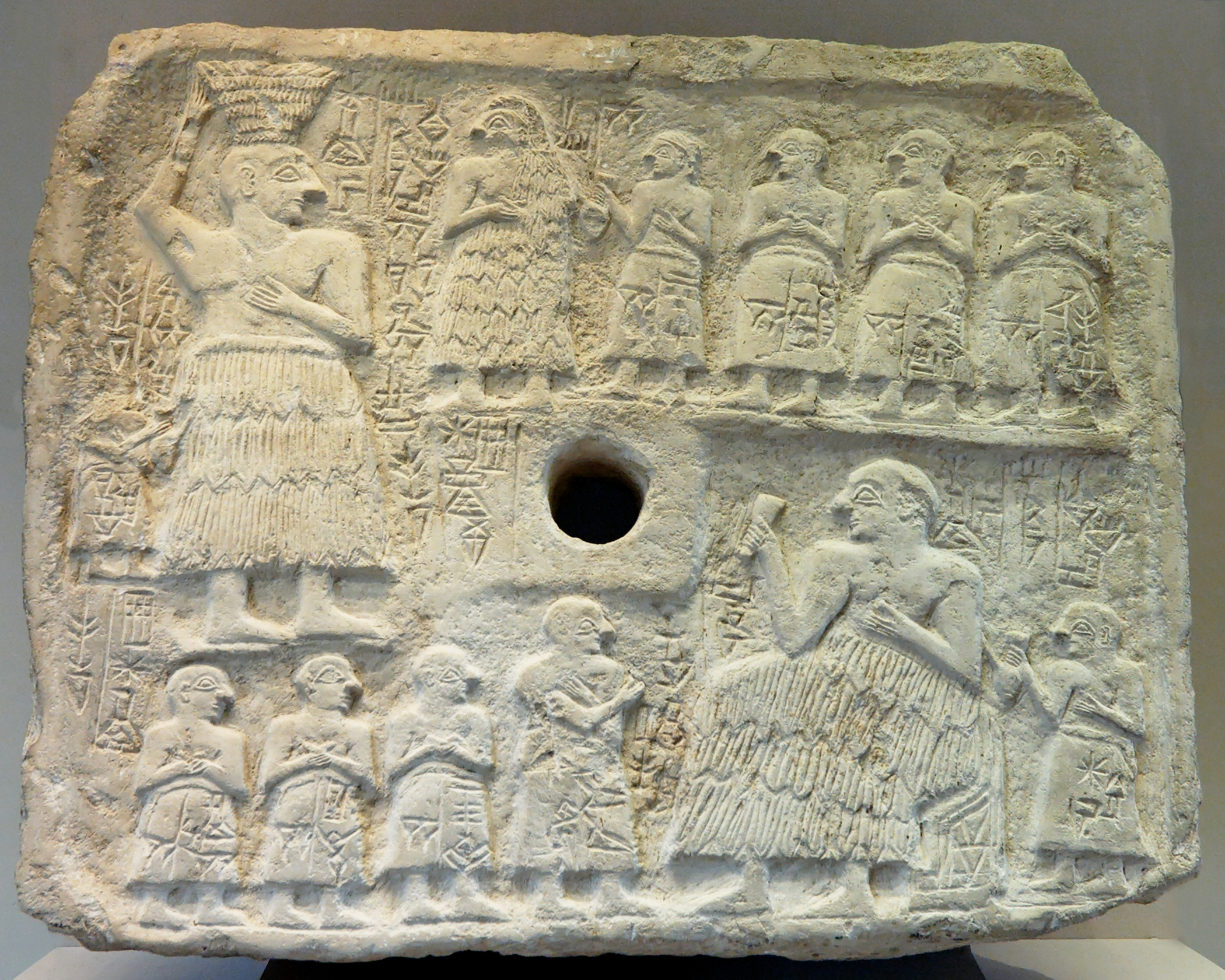
Relief of Ur-Nanshe. At the top he creates the foundation for a shrine, at the bottom he presides over the dedication (Louvre).

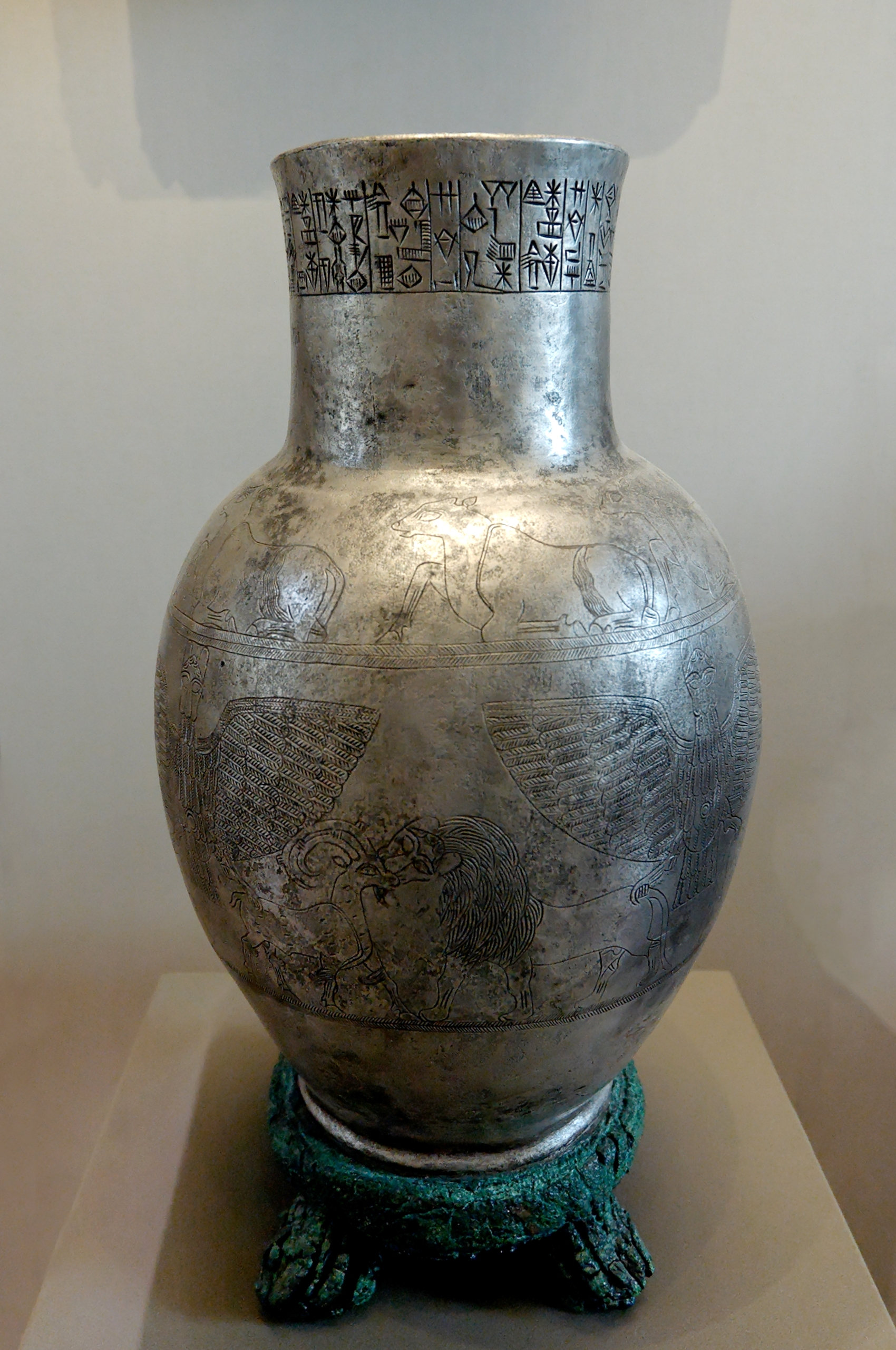
Entemena's inscribed silver vase, c. 2400 BC (Louvre)

The dynasties of Lagash are not found on the Sumerian King List (SKL) despite being a power in the Early Dynastic period and a major city in the centuries that followed. One tablet, from the later Old Babylonian period and known as The Rulers of Lagash, was described by its translator as "rather fanciful" and is generally considered to be a satirical parody of the SKL. The thirty listed rulers, in the style of the SKL, having improbable reigns, include seven known rulers from the 1st Dynasty of Lagash, including Ur-Nanshe, "Ane-tum", En-entar-zid, Ur-Ningirsu, Ur-Bau, and Gudea.

Little is known of the first two rulers of Lagash. En-hegal is believed to be the first ruler of Lagash. A tablet with his name describes a business transaction, in which a possible King En-hegal buys land. Both his status and date are disputed. He was followed by Lugalshaengur about whom also little is known. Mesilim, who called himself King of Kish though it is uncertain which city he was from, named Lugalshaengur as an "ensi" of Lagash on a mace head.

==== Ur-Nanshe ====
While many details like the length of reign are not known for the next ruler, Ur-Nanshe, a number of his inscriptions have been found, most at Lagash with one stele at Ur, which along with Umma, he claimed to have conquered in battle. Almost all deal with the construction of temples, one details how he "built the wester[n] channel at the side of Sa[la]/ channel at the side of S[al] (against) the Amorites". He is described as the "son of Gu-NI.DU" (occasionally as "son of Gur:SAR"), and his inscriptions list a number of sons and daughters. Several inscriptions say "He [had the ships of Dil]mun sub[mit] [timber] (to Lagaš) as tribute." His son Akurgal ruled briefly after him.

==== Eannatum ====
The next ruler, Eannatum (earlier referred to as "Eannadu"), son of Akurgal and grandson of Ur-Nanshe, turned Lagash into a major power extending throughout large areas of Mesopotamia and to the east as well. In an inscription found at ancient Adab:

"Eannatum, ruler of Lagash, granted strength by Enlil, nourished with special milk by Ninhursag, nominated by Ningirsu, chosen in her heart by Nanshe, son of Akurgal ruler of Lagash, defeated mountainous Elam, defeated Urua, defeated Umma, defeated Ur. At that time, he built a well of fired bricks for Ningirsu in his (Ningirsu’s) broad courtyard. His personal god is Shulultul. Then, Ningirsu loved Eannatum."

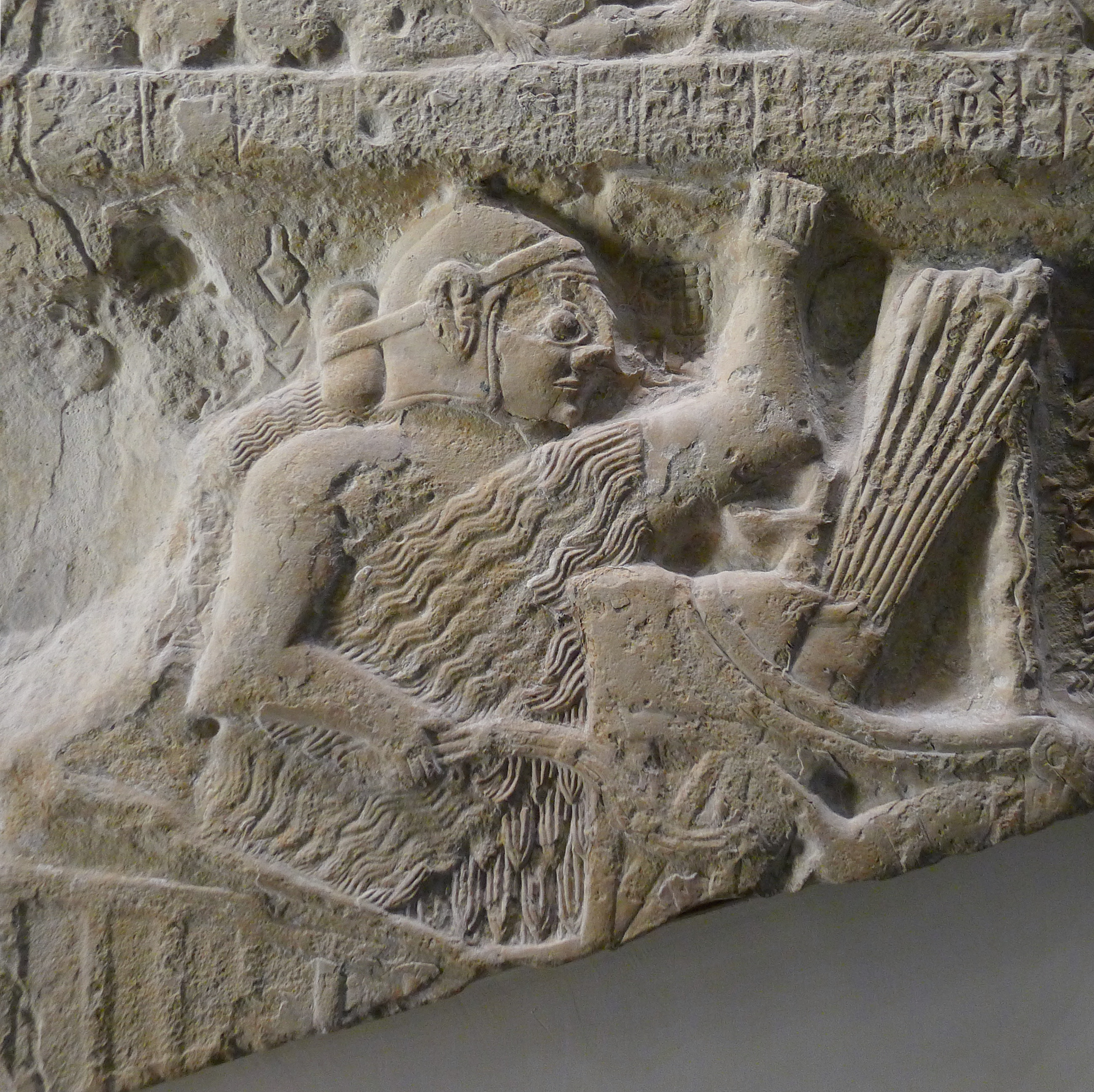
Eannatum, King of Lagash, riding a war chariot (detail of the Stele of the Vultures). His name "Eannatum" (𒂍𒀭𒈾𒁺) is written vertically in two columns in front of his head. Louvre Museum.

Another inscription detail his destruction of "Kiš, Akšak, and Mari at a place named Antasur". He also claimed to have taken the city of Akshak and killed its king, Zuzu. Eannatum took the city of Uru'az on the Persian Gulf, and exacted tribute as far as Mari; however, many of the realms he conquered were often in revolt. During his reign, temples and palaces were repaired or erected at Lagash and elsewhere and canals and reservoirs were excavated. During his reign, Dilmun was a major trading partner.

A long running border dispute, dating back at least to the time of Lugalshaengur, existed between the city-states of Umma and Lagash. In the time of Umma ruler Enakalle a formal border was established, mediated by Mesilim, “king of Kish”. Eannatum restored the border, including the boundary markers of Mesilim.

"Eanatum, ruler of Lagash, uncle of Enmetena ruler of Lagash, demarcated the border with Enakalle, ruler of Umma. He extended the [boundary-]channel from the Nun-channel to Guʾedena, leaving a 215-nindan [= 1,290 meters] [strip] of Ningirsu’s land under Umma’s control, establishing a no-man’s land there. He inscribed [and erected] monuments at that [boundary-]channel, and restored the monument of Mesilim, but did not cross into the plain of Umma. "

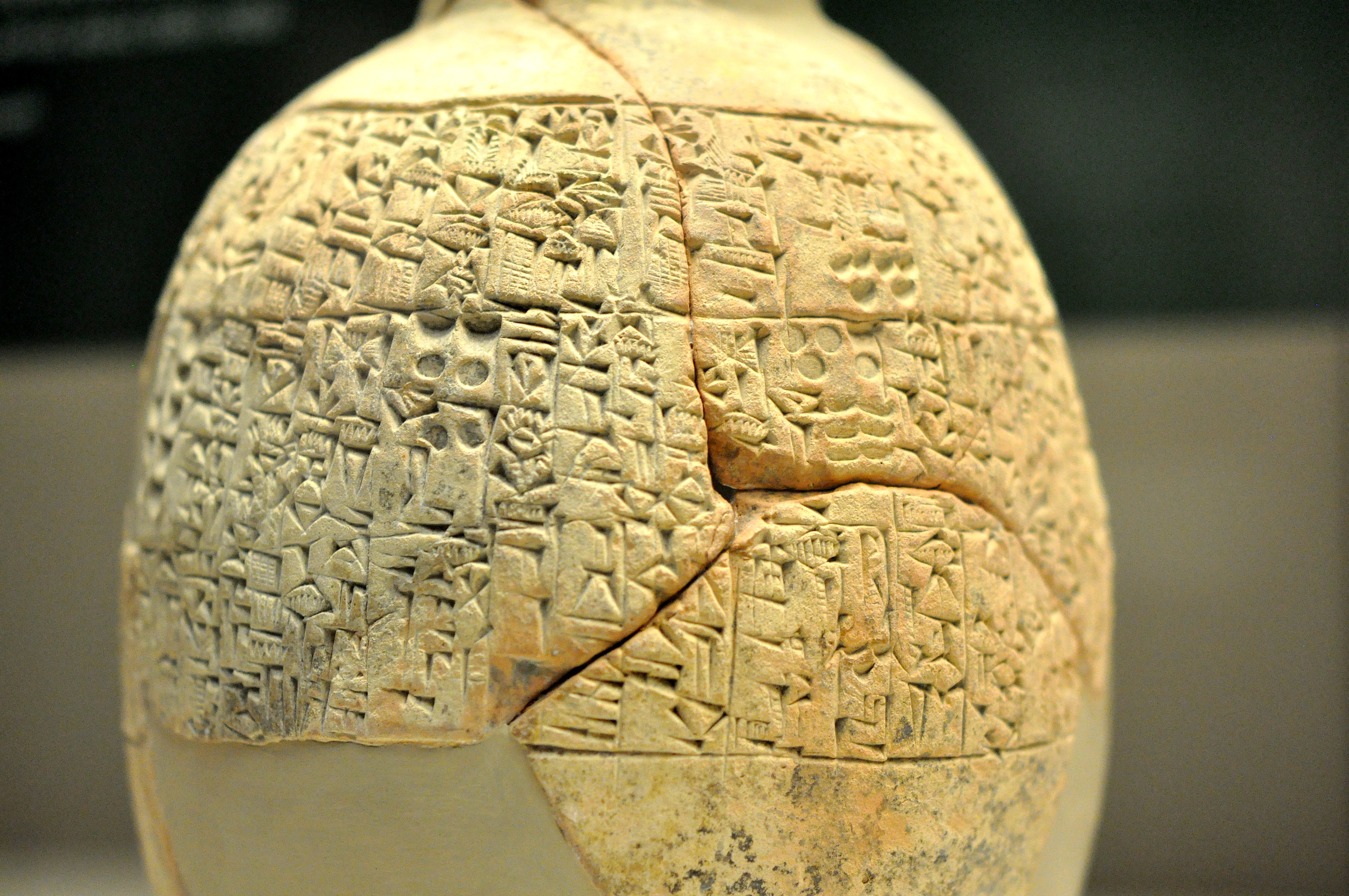
Vase of King Gishakidu, king of Umma, and son of Ur-Lumma, giving the city of Umma's account of its long-running border dispute with Lagash. The vase redefines the frontier by recording the locations of stelae to the god Shara, as well as the distances between them. Circa 2350 BC. From Umma, Iraq. Ref. 140889, British Museum, London.

In c. 2450 BC, Lagash and the neighboring city of Umma fell out with each other after a border dispute over the Guʾedena, a fertile area lying between them. As described in Stele of the Vultures, of which only a portion has been found (7 fragments), the current king of Lagash, Eannatum, inspired by the patron god of his city, Ningirsu, set out with his army to defeat the nearby city. According to the Stele's engravings, when the two sides met each other in the field, Eannatum dismounted from his chariot and proceeded to direct his men on foot. After lowering their spears, the Lagash army advanced upon the army from Umma in a dense phalanx. After a brief clash, Eannatum and his army had gained victory over the army of Umma. This battle is one of the earliest depicted organised battles known to scholars and historians.

Eannatum was succeeded by his brother, En-anna-tum I. Given the many inscriptions his reign is assumed to be of some length. Most of them detailed the usual temple construction. On long tablet described the continued conflict with Umma:

"For the god Hendursag, chief herald of the Abzu En-anatum, [ru]ler of [Laga]š ... When the god Enlil(?)], for the god [Nin]g[ir]s[u], took [Gu'edena] from the hands of Gisa (Umma) and filled En-anatum’s hands with it, Ur-LUM-ma, ruler of Gisa (Umma), [h]i[red] [(mercenaries from) the foreign lands] and transgressed the boun[da]ry-channel of the god Ningirsu (and said): ... En-anatum crushed Ur-LUM-ma, ruler of Gisa (Umma) as far as E-kisura (“Boundary) Channel”) of the god Ninœirsu. He pursued him into the ... of (the town) LUM-ma-girnunta. (En-anatum) gagged (Ur-LUM-ma) (against future land claims)"

The conflict from the Umma side of things from its ruler Ur-Lumma:

"Urlumma, ruler of Umma, diverted water into the boundary-channel of Ningirsu and the boundary-channel of Nan-she. He set fire to their monuments and smashed them, and destroyed the established chapels of the gods that were built on the boundary-levee called Namnunda-kigara. He recruited foreigners and transgressed the boundary-ditch of Ningirsu."

==== Entemena ====
The next ruler, Entemena increased the power of Lagash during his rule. A number of inscriptions from his reign are known. He was a contemporary of Lugalkinishedudu of Uruk.

Entemena was succeeded by his brother Enannatum II, with only one known inscription where he "restored for the god Ningirsu his brewery". He was followed by two more minor rulers, Enentarzi (only one inscription from his 5 year reign, which mentions his daughter Gem[e]-Baba), and Lugalanda (several inscriptions, one mentions his wife Bara-namtara) the son of Enentarzi. The last ruler of Lagash, Urukagina, was known for his judicial, social, and economic reforms, and his may well be the first legal code known to have existed. He was defeated by Lugalzagesi, beginning when Lugalzagesi was ruler of Umma and culminating as ruler of Uruk, bringing an end to the First Dynasty of Lagash. About 1800 cuneiform tablets from the reigns of the last three rulers of Lagash, of an administrative nature, have been found, mostly. The tablets are mostly from the "woman’s quarter" also known as the temple of the goddess Babu. It was under the control of the Queen.

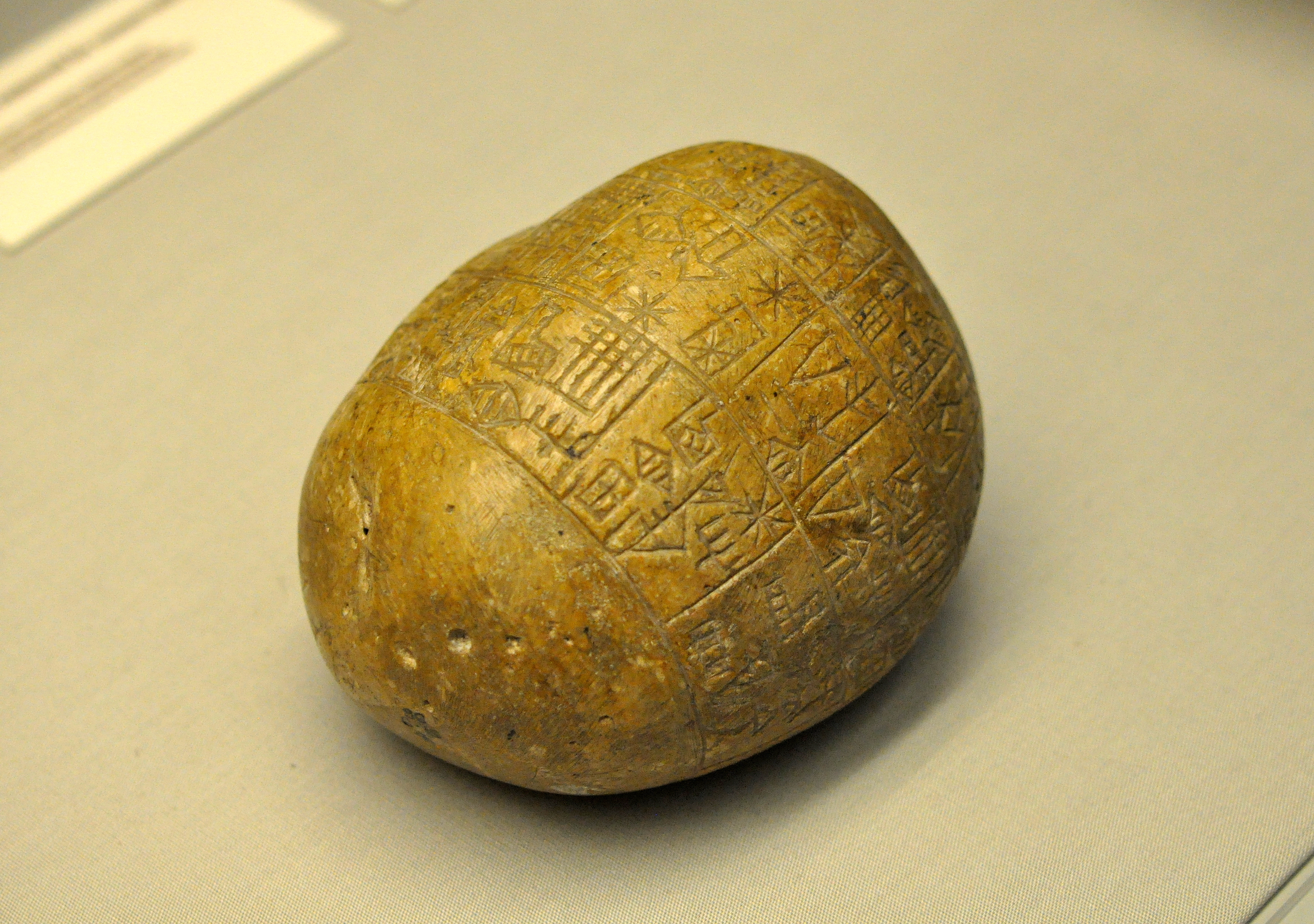
The cuneiform text states that Enannatum I reminds the gods of his prolific temple achievements in Lagash. Circa 2400 BC. From Girsu, Iraq. The British Museum, London

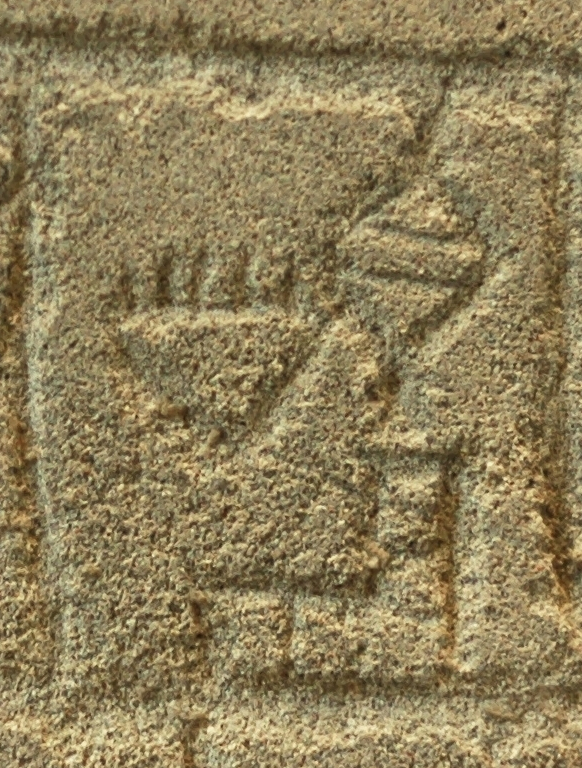
The name "Lagash" (𒉢𒁓𒆷) in vertical cuneiform of the time of Ur-Nanshe.

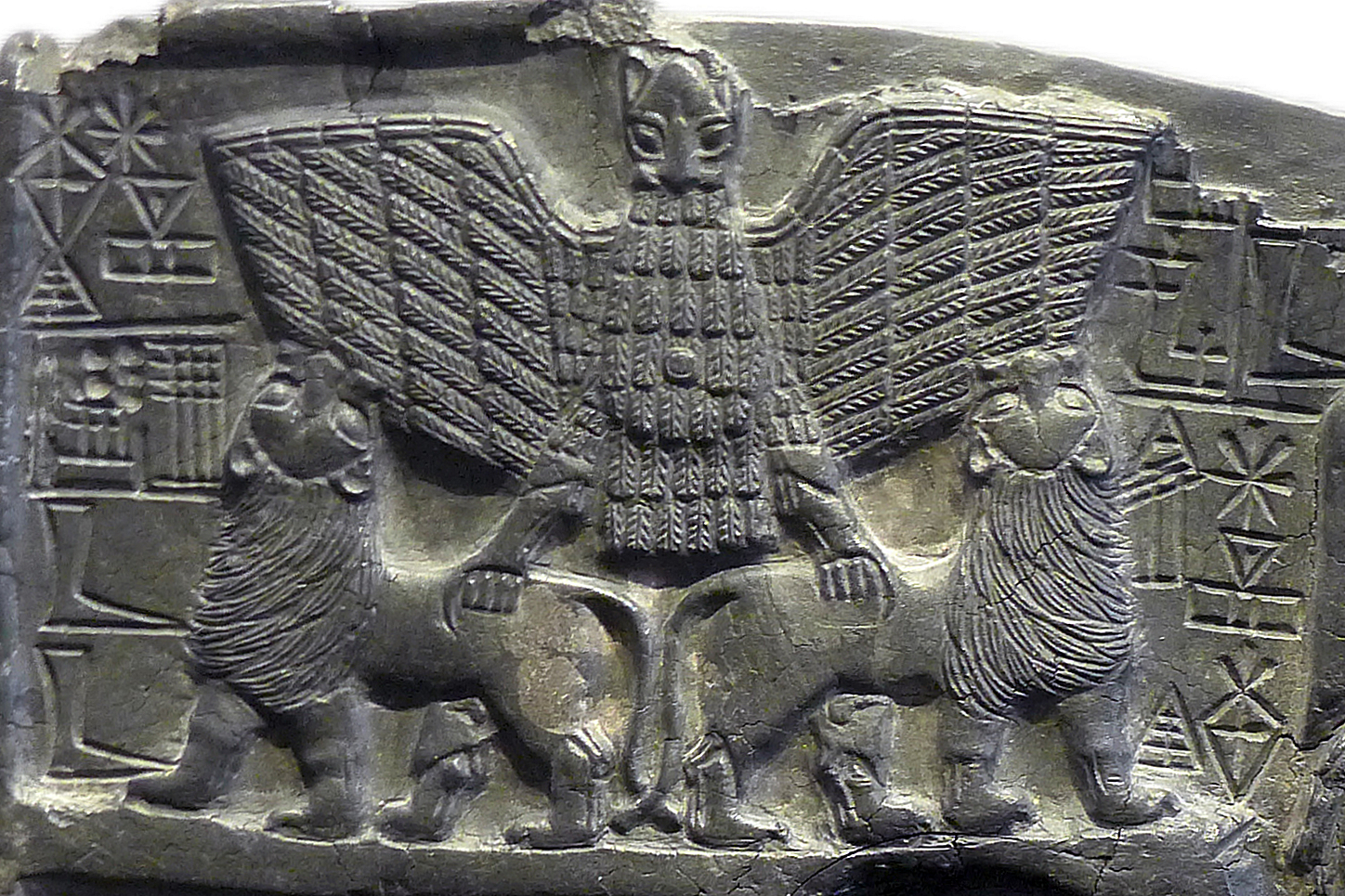
The Anzû, symbol of Lagash, in a Master of Animals motif, at the time of Entemena.

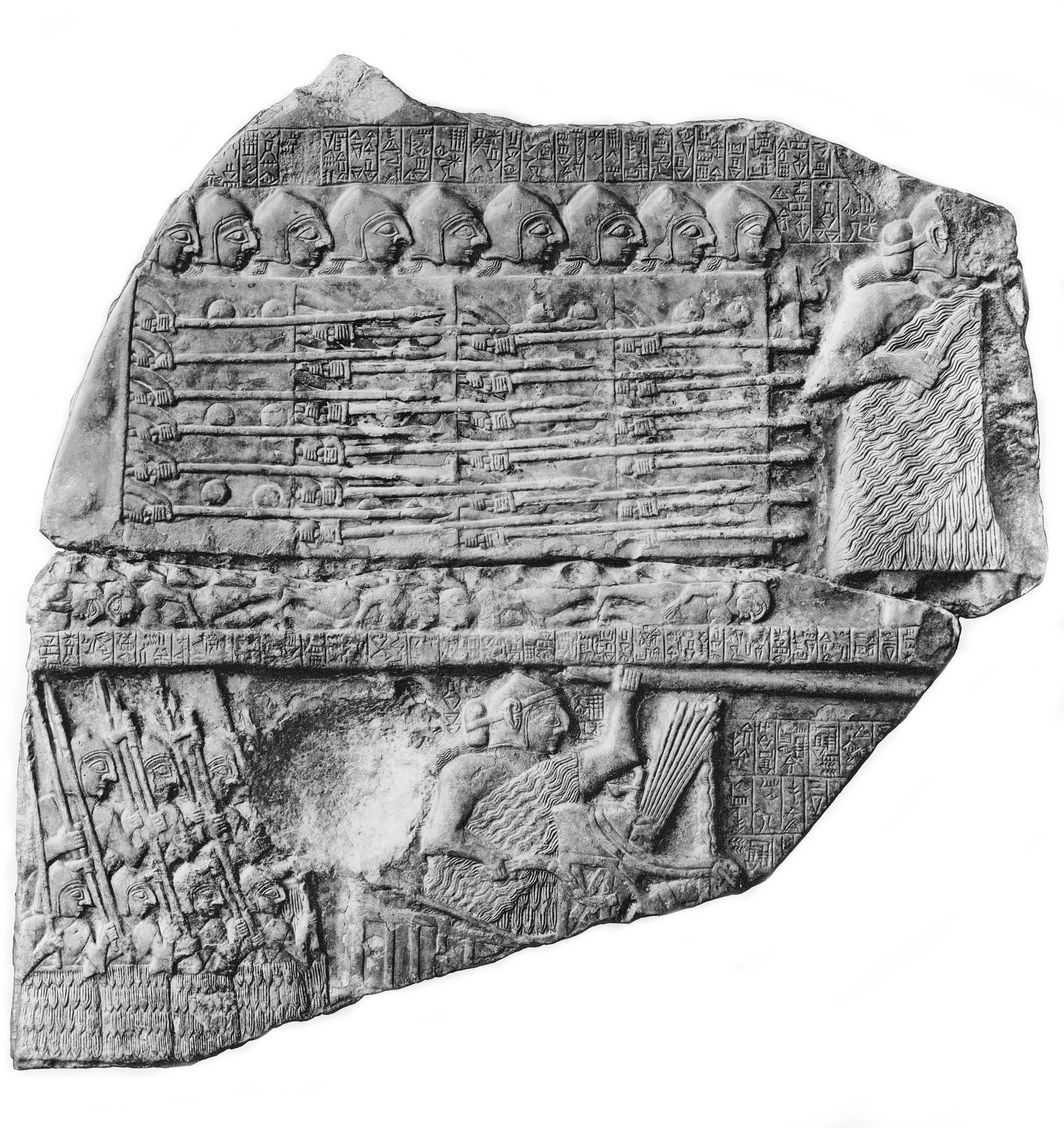
The armies of Lagash led by Eannatum in their conflict against Umma.

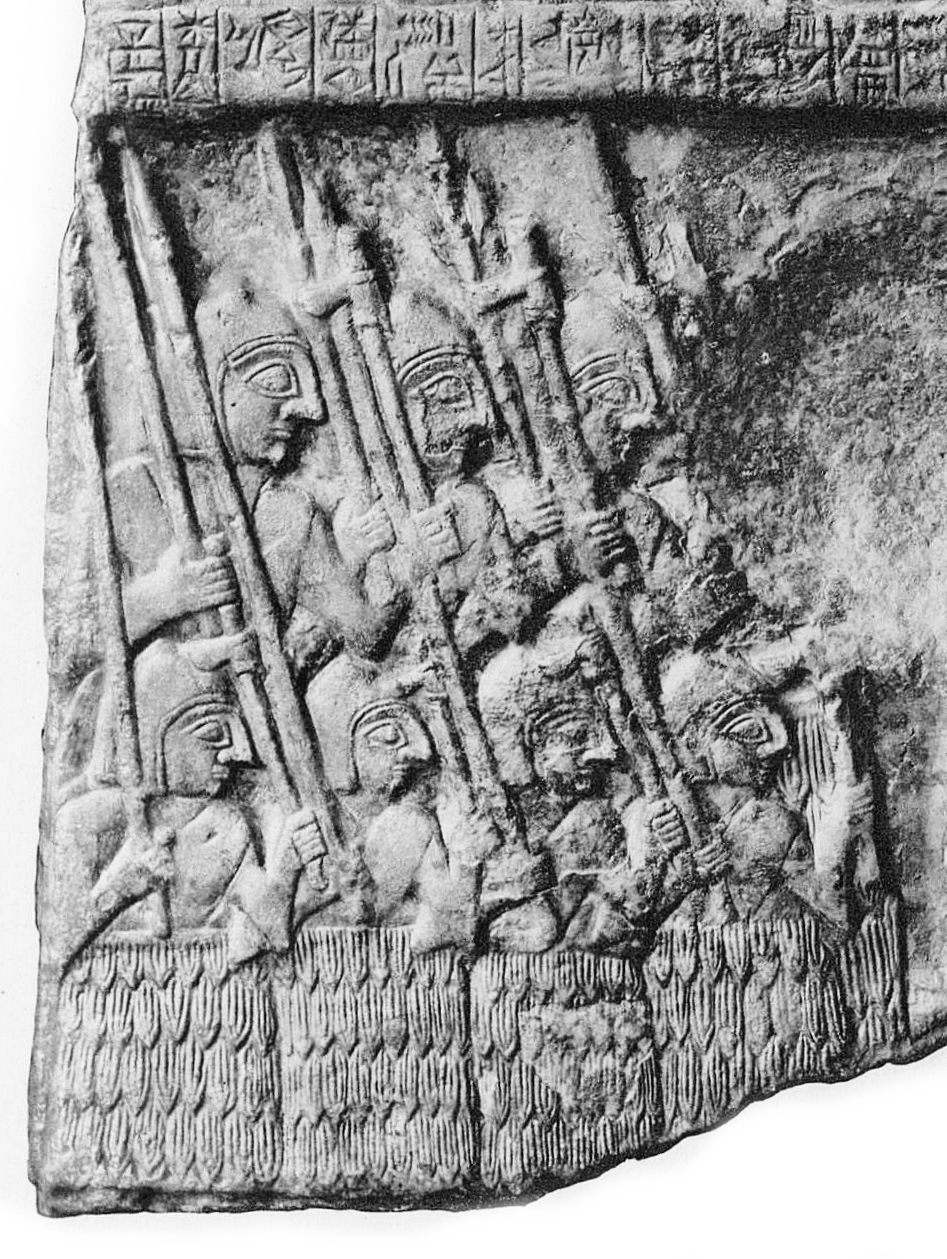
Lancers of the army of Lagash against Umma

=== Under the Akkadian Empire ===
In his conquest of Sumer circa 2300 BC, Sargon of Akkad, after conquering and destroying Uruk, then conquered Ur and E-Ninmar and "laid waste" the territory from Lagash to the sea, and from there went on to conquer and destroy Umma, and he collected tribute from Mari and Elam. He triumphed over 34 cities in total.

Sargon's son and successor Rimush faced widespread revolts, and had to reconquer the cities of Ur, Umma, Adab, Lagash, Der, and Kazallu from rebellious ensis.

Rimush introduced mass slaughter and large scale destruction of the Sumerian city-states, and maintained meticulous records of his destruction. Most of the major Sumerian cities were destroyed, and Sumerian human losses were enormous: for the cities of Ur and Lagash, he records 8,049 killed, 5,460 "captured and enslaved" and 5,985 "expelled and annihilated".

A Victory Stele in several fragments (three in total, Louvre Museum AO 2678) has been attributed to Rimush on stylistic and epigraphical grounds. One of the fragments mentions Akkad and Lagash. It is thought that the stele represents the defeat of Lagash by the troops of Akkad. The stele was excavated in ancient Girsu, one of the main cities of the territory of Lagash.

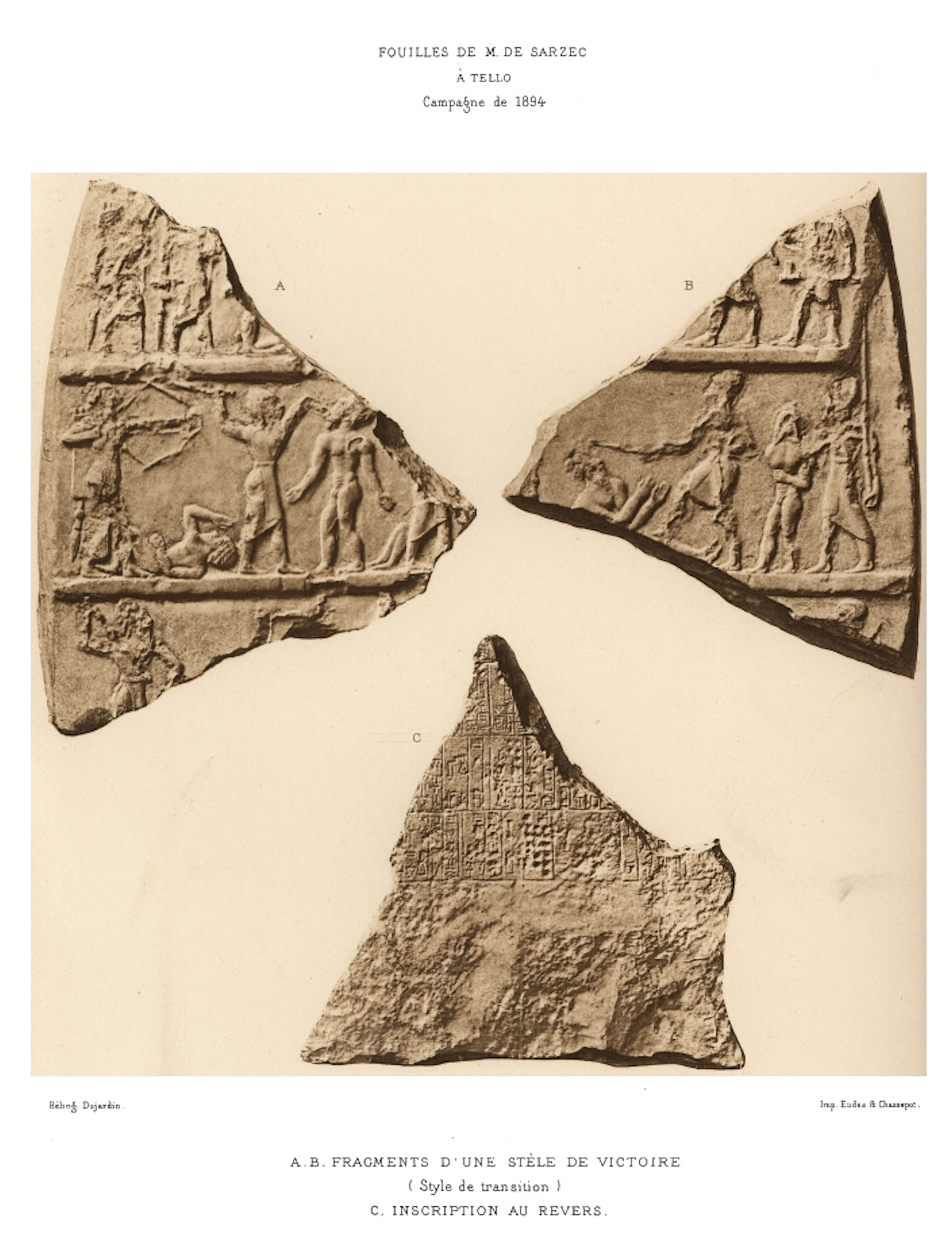
Fragments of the Victory Stele of Rimush. The Victory Stele also has an epigraphic fragment, mentioning Akkad and Lagash. It suggests the stele represents the defeat of Lagash by the troops of Akkad.

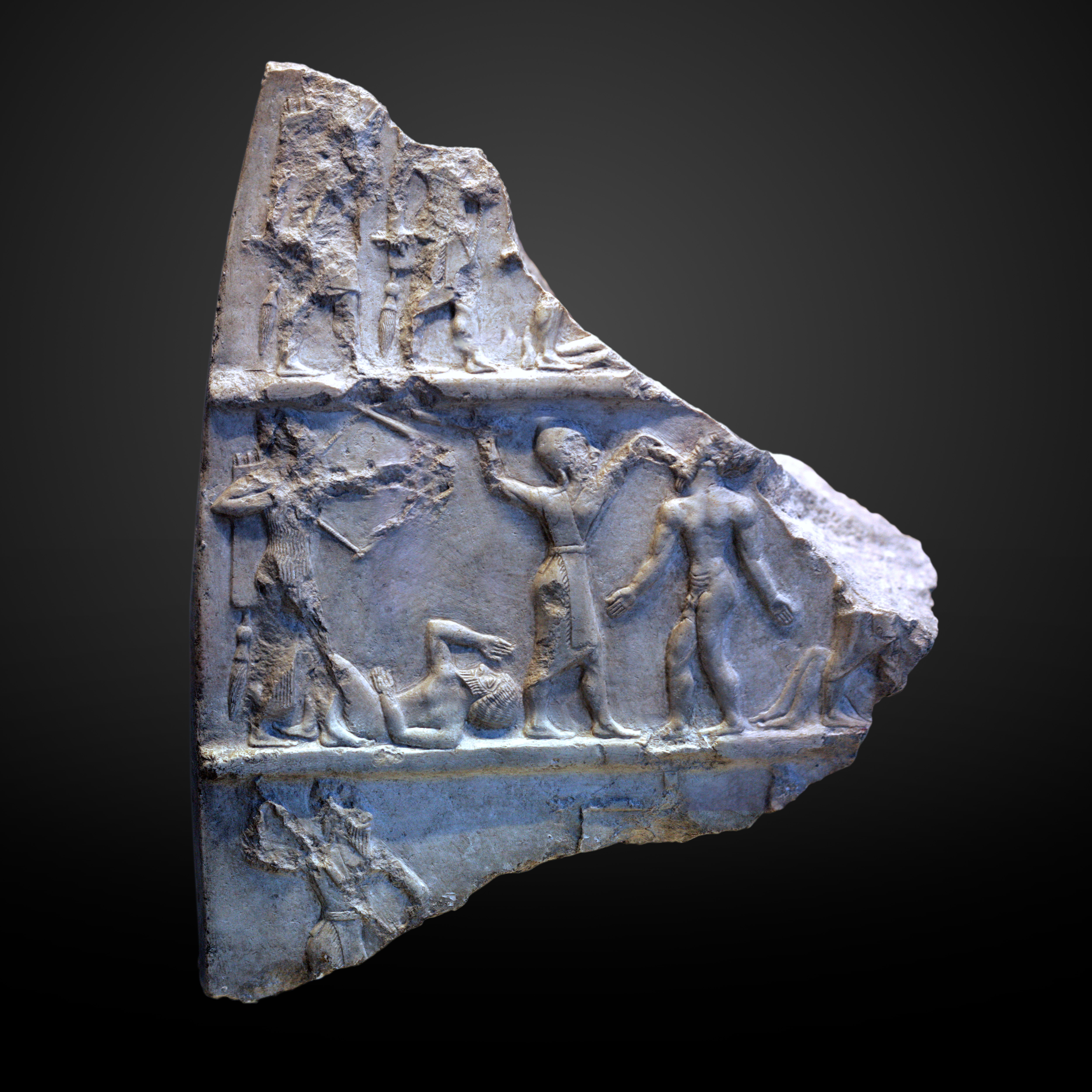
Possible victory stele of king Rimush (front). Generally attributed to Rimush on stylistic grounds.

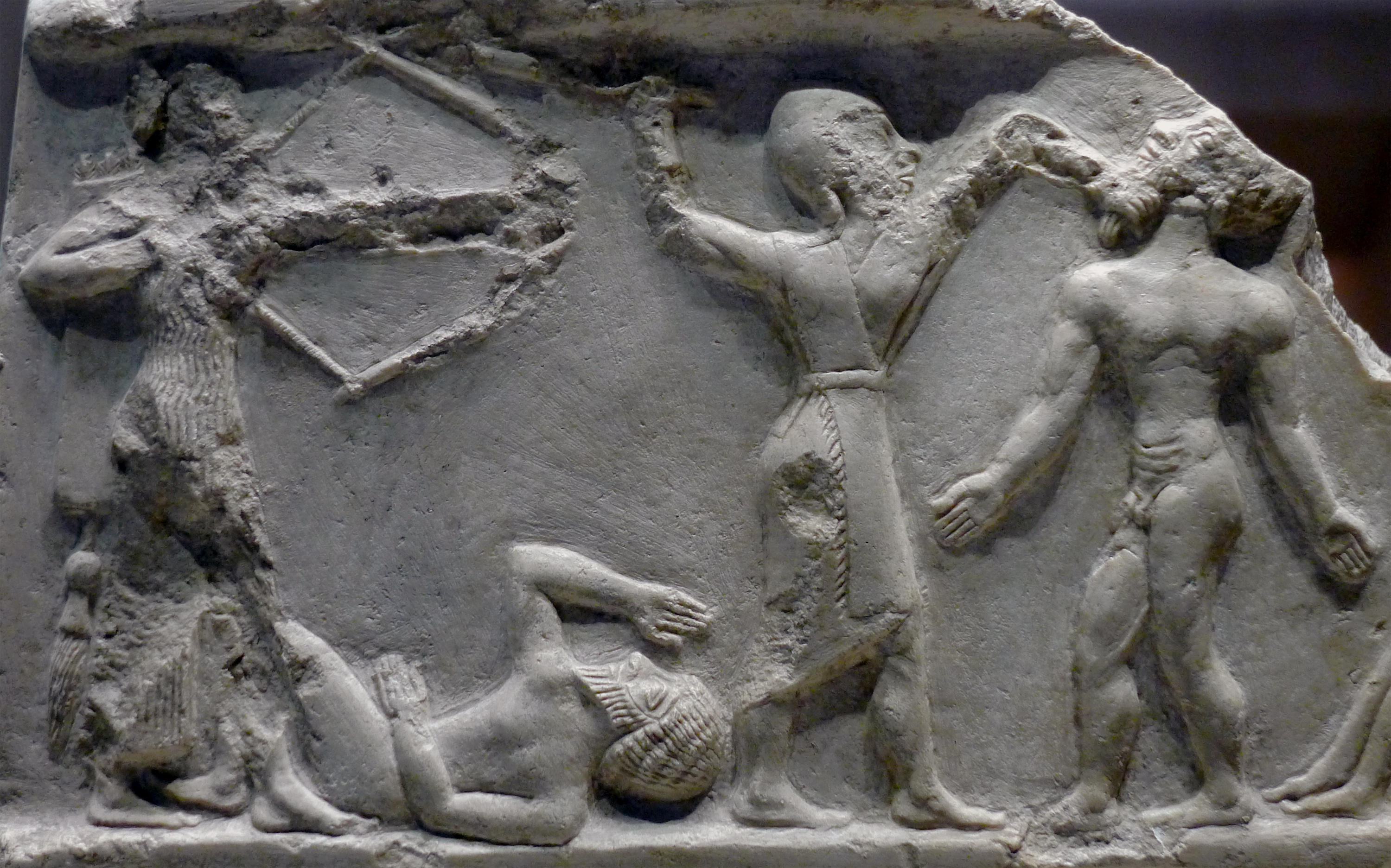
Detail

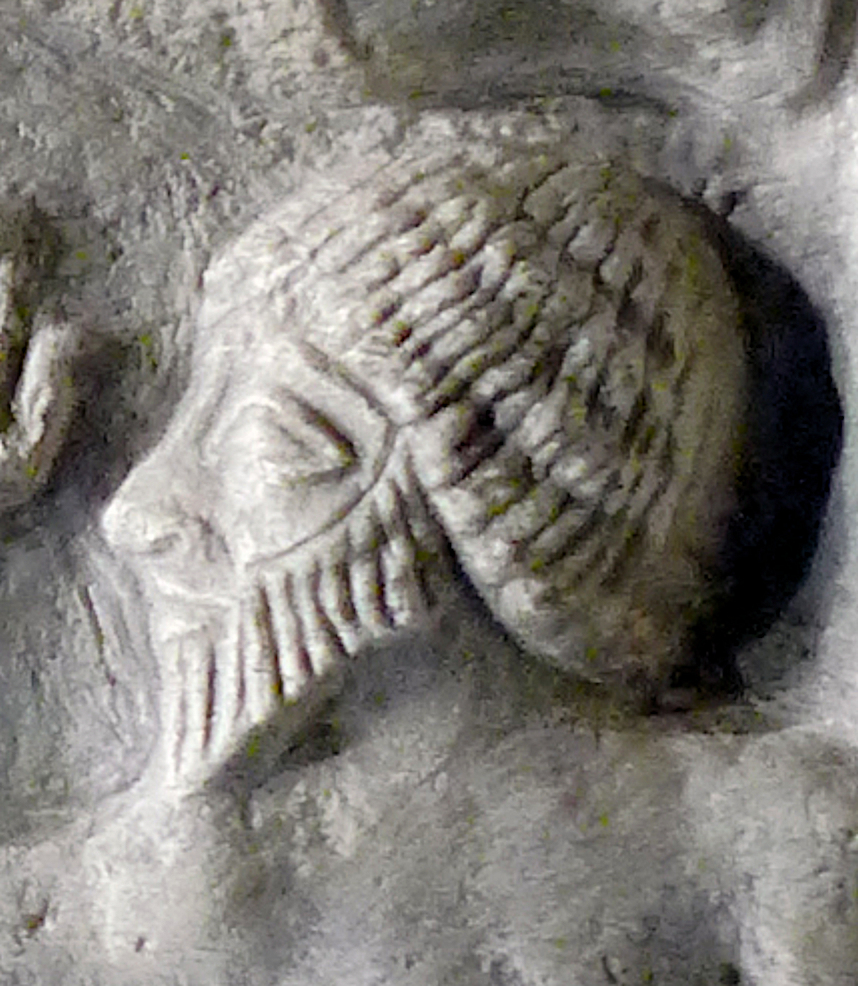
Man of Lagash, circa 2270 BC, from the Victory Stele. The same hairstyle can be seen in other statues from Lagash.

=== Second dynasty of Lagash (c. 2260 – c. 2023 BC) ===
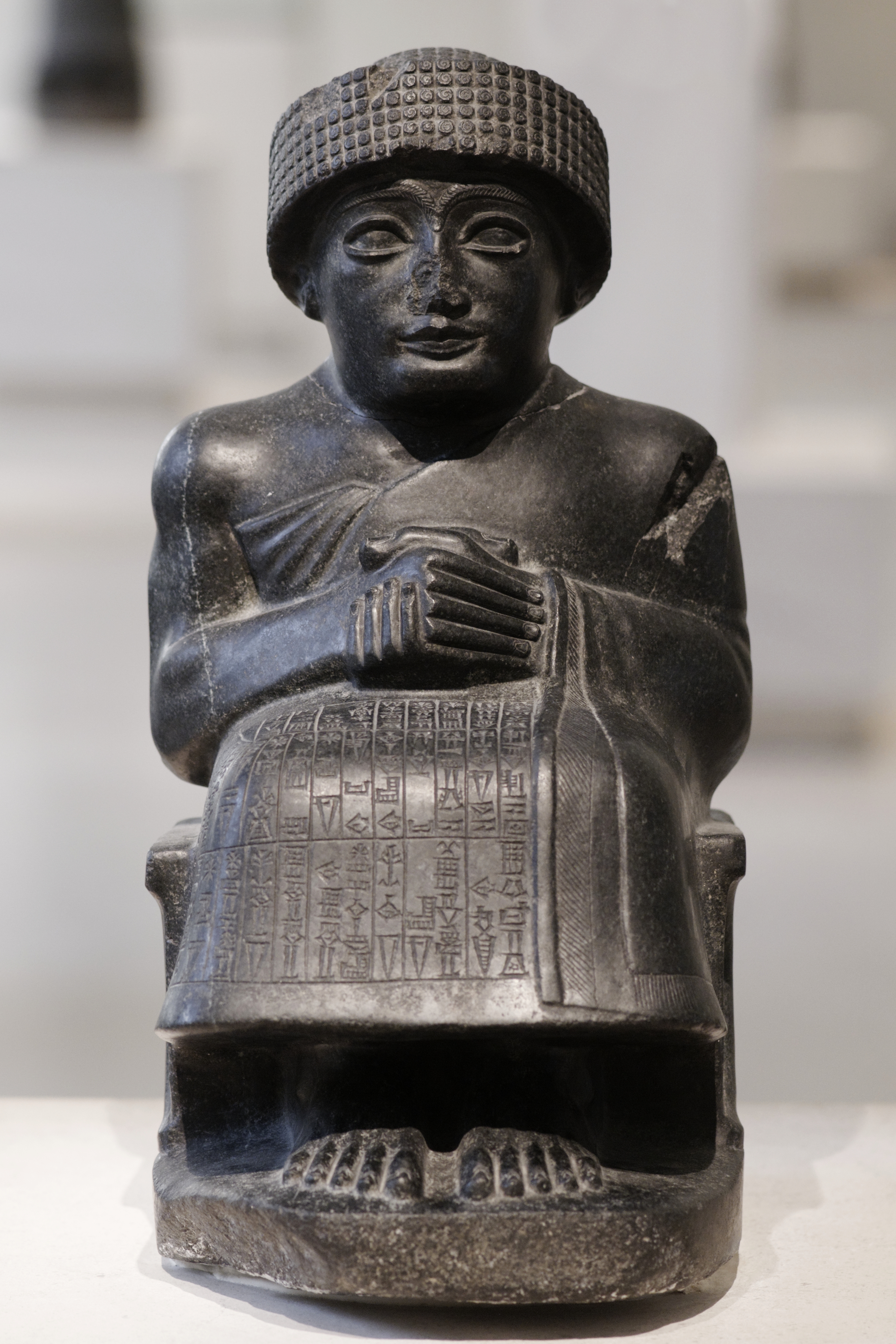
Gudea of Lagash (ruled c. 2144–2124 BC). Diorite statue found at Girsu (Louvre Museum)

During the reigns of the first two rulers of this dynasty Lugal-ushumgal (under Naram-Sin and Shar-Kali-Sharri) and Puzur-Mama (under Shar-kali-shari), Lagash was still under the control of the Akkadian Empire. It has been suggested that another governor, Ur-e, fell between them. After the death of Shar-Kali-shari Puzur-Mama declared Lagash independent (known from an inscription that may also mention Elamite ruler Kutik-Inshushinak). This independence appears to have been tenuous as Akkadian Empire ruler Dudu reports taking booty from there.

With the fall of Akkad, Lagash achieved full independence under Ur-Ningirsu I (not to be confused with the later Lagash ruler named Ur-Ningirsu, the son of Gudea). Unlike the 1st Dynasty of Lagash, this series of rulers used year names. Two of Ur-Ningirsu are known including "year: Ur-Ningirsu (became) ruler". His few inscriptions are religious in nature. Almost nothing is known of his son and successor. The next three rulers, Lu-Baba, Lugula, and Kaku are known only from their first year names. The following ruler, Ur-Baba, is notable mainly because three of his daughters married later rulers of Lagash, Gudea, Nam-mahani, and Ur-gar. His inscriptions are all of a religious nature, including building or restoring the "Eninnu, the White Thunderbird". Five of his year names are known. At this point Lagash is still at best a small local power. In some case the absolute order of rulers is not known with complete certainty.

==== Gudea ====
While the Gutians had partially filled the power vacuum left by the fall of the Akkadian Empire, under Gudea Lagash entered a period of independence marked by riches and power. Thousands of inscriptions of various sorts have been found from his reign and an untold number of statues of Gudea. A number of cuneiform tablets of an administrative nature, from Gudea's rule were found at nearby Girsu. Also found at Girsu were the famous Gudea cylinders which contain the longest known text in the Sumerian language. He was prolific at temple building and restoring. He is known to have conducted some military operations to the east against Anshan and Elam. Twenty of Gudea's year names are known. All are of a religious nature except for one that marks the building of a canal and year six "Year in which the city of Anszan was smitten by weapons". While the conventional view has been that the reign of Gudea fell well before that of Ur-Nammu, ruler of Ur, and during a time of Gutian power, a number of researchers contend that Gudea's rule overlaps with that of Ur-Nammu and the Gutians had already been defeated. This view is strengthened by the fact that Ur-Baba appointed Enanepada as high priestess of Ur while Naram-Sin of Akkad had appointed her predecessor Enmenana and Ur-Namma of Ur appointed her successor Ennirgalana.

Gudea was succeeded by his son Ur-Ningirsu, followed by Ur-gar. Little is known about either aside from an ascension year name each and a small handful of inscriptions. It has been suggested that two other brief rulers fit into the sequence here, Ur-ayabba and Ur-Mama but the evidence for that is thin. Two tablets dated to the reign of Ur-Nammu of Ur refer to Ur-ayabba as "ensi" of Lagash, meaning governor in Ur III terms and king in Lagash.

==== Nam-mahani ====
Little is known of the next ruler aside from his ascension year name and a handful of religious inscriptions. Nam-mahani is primarily known for being defeated by Ur-Nammu, first ruler of the Ur III empire, and for being considered the last ruler of the second dynasty of Lagash (often called the Gudean Dynasty). In the prologue of the Code of Ur-Nammu it states "He slew Nam-ha-ni the ensi of Lagash". A number of his inscriptions were defaced and the statues of Nam-mahani and his wife were beheaded (the heads were not found with the statues, suggested to be due to an act of Damnatio memoriae attributed to Ur Nammu).

=== Under the Ur III Empire ===
Under the control of Ur, the Lagash state (Lagash, Girsu, and Nigin) were the largest and most prosperous province of the empire. Such was its importance that the second highest official in the empire, the Grand Vizier, resided there. The name of one governor of Lagash under Ur is known, Ir-Nanna. After the fifth year of the last Ur III ruler, Ibbi-Sin, his year name was no longer used at Lagash, indicating Ur no longer controlled that city.

== Archaeology ==
At the time of Hammurabi, Lagash was located near the shoreline of the gulf.

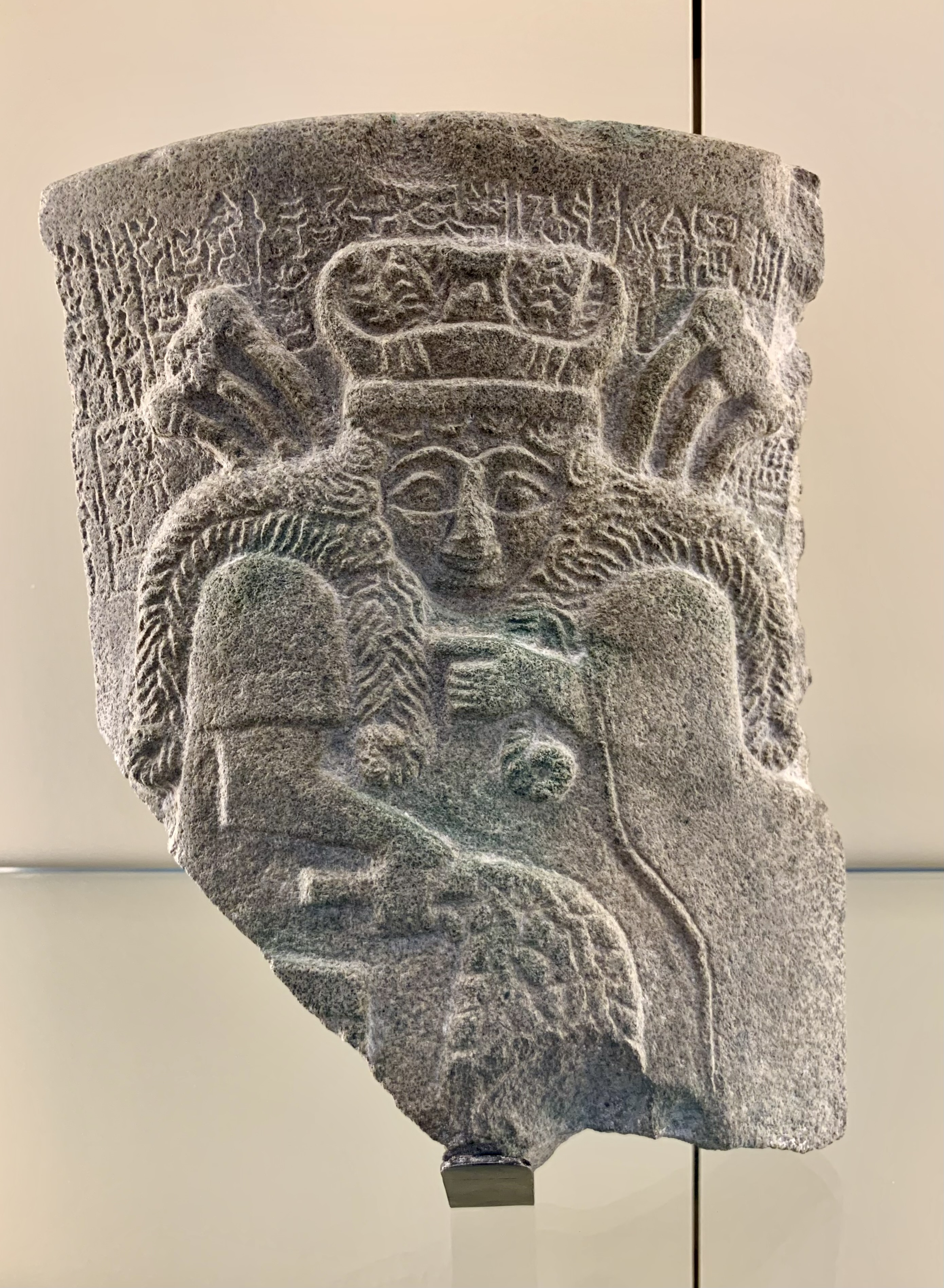
Goddess Nisaba with an inscription of Entemena, ruler of Lagash (2430 BC), steatite, Vorderasiatisches Museum Berlin

Lagash is one of the largest archaeological sites in the region, measuring roughly 3.5 kilometers north to south and 1.5 kilometers east to west though is relatively low being only 6 meters above the plain level at maximum. Much of the older area is under the current water table and not available for research. A drone survey posited that Lagash developed on four marsh islands some of which were gated, but the notion that the city was marsh-based is in contention. Estimates of its area range from 400 to 600 hectares (990 to 1,480 acres). The site is divided by the bed of a canal/river, which runs diagonally through the mound. The site was first excavated, for six weeks, by Robert Koldewey in 1887.

"To be sure, the difficulties involved were known, at least after Koldewey’s disaster in el-Hibba where, unprepared to deal with structures of unbaked material, he did not recognize the walls but only those baked bricks which had been used for lining graves, leading him to conclude that el-Hibba was nothing but an extended burial place."

It was inspected during a survey of the area by Thorkild Jacobsen and Fuad Safar in 1953, finding the first evidence of its identification as Lagash. The major polity in the region of al-Hiba and Tello had formerly been identified as ŠIR.BUR.LA (Shirpurla).

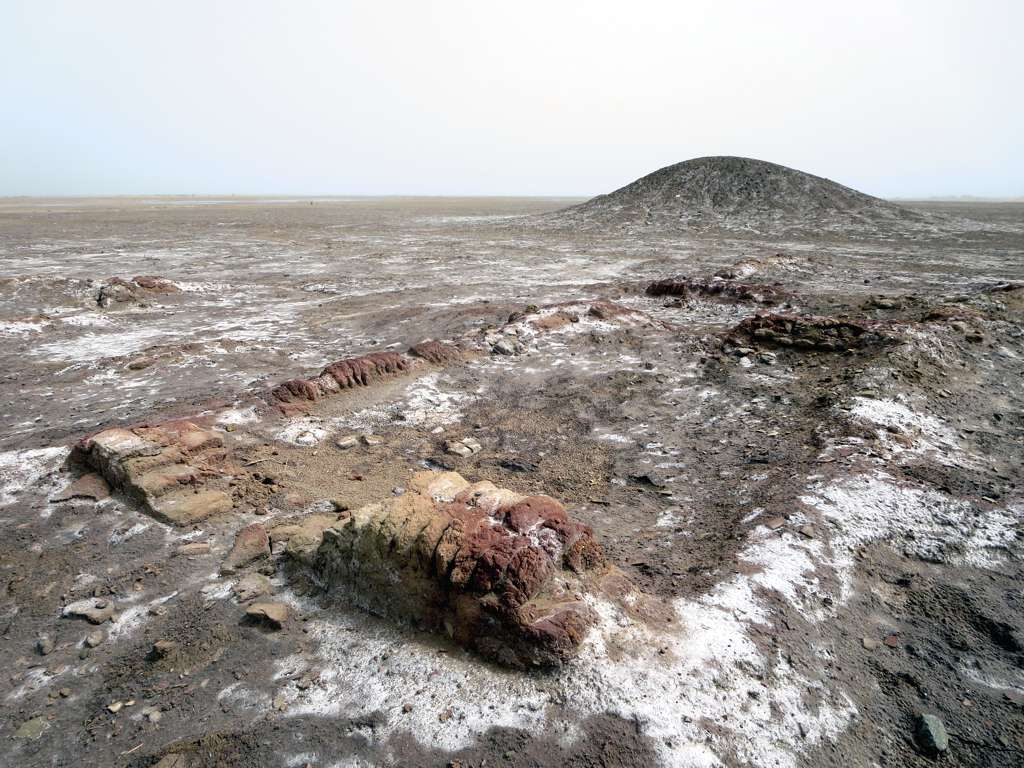
Remains of the ancient city of Lagash

Tell Al-Hiba was again explored in five seasons of excavation between 1968 and 1976 by a team from the Metropolitan Museum of Art and the Institute of Fine Arts of New York University. The team was led by Vaughn E. Crawford, and included Donald P. Hansen and Robert D. Biggs. Twelve archaeological layers were found with the bottom 9 being Early Dynastic and the lowest under the water table. The primary focus was the excavation of the temple Ibgal of Inanna and the temple Bagara of Ningirsu, as well as an associated administrative area. The team returned 12 years later, in 1990, for a sixth and final season of excavation led by D. P. Hansen. The work focused on “Area G” between the previously-excavated temple Ibgal of the goddess Inanna in the southwest edge of the city and the Bagara temple of Ningirsu, both of which were built by Early Dynastic III king Eannatum. Temples to the goddesses Gatumdag, Nanshe, and Bau are known to have existed but have not yet been found. A canal linked the E-ninnu temple of Ningirsu at Girsu, the E-sirara temple of Nanshe at Nigin, and the Bagara temple at Lagash, the three cities being part of one large state. In 1984 a surface survey found that most finds were from the Early Dynastic III period. Small amounts of Uruk, Jemdet Nasr, Isin-Larsa, Old Babylonian and Kassite shards were found in isolated areas.

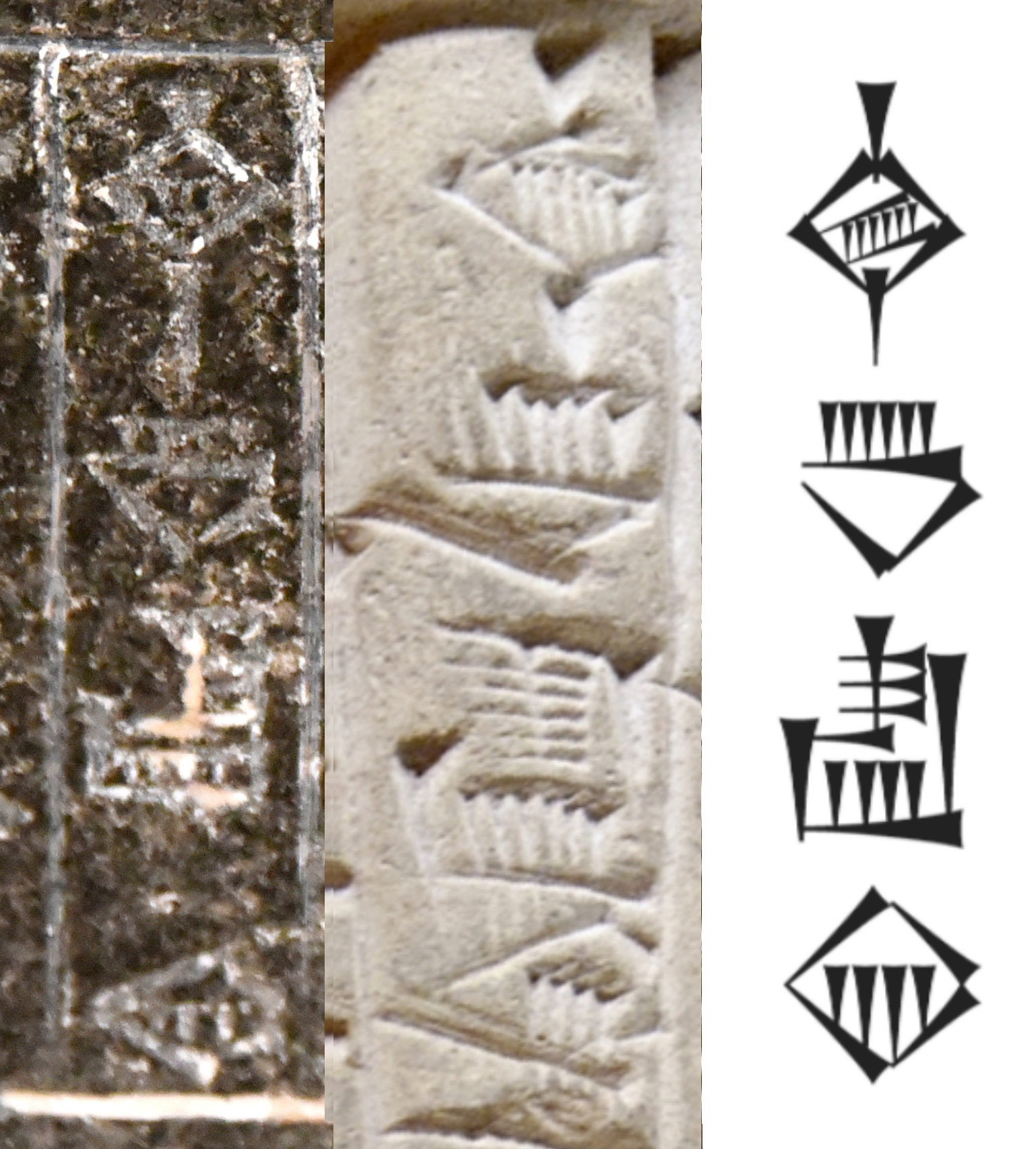
The name Lagash Ki (𒉢𒁓𒆷𒆠, "Country of Lagash") on inscriptions of Gudea, in monumental linear script and cuneiform script on clay.

In March–April 2019, field work resumed as the Lagash Archaeological Project under the directorship of Dr. Holly Pittman of the University of Pennsylvania's Penn Museum in collaboration with the University of Cambridge and Sara Pizzimenti of the University of Pisa. A second season ran from October to November in 2021. A third season ran from March 6 to April 10, 2022. The work primarily involved the Early Dynastic Period Area G and Area H locations along with Geophysical Surveying and Geoarchaeology. The focus was on an industrial area and associated streets, residences, and kilns. Aerial mapping of Lagash, both using UAV drone mapping and satellite imagery was performed. In the fall of 2022 a 4th season of excavation resumed. Among the finds were a public eatery with ovens, a refrigeration system, benches, and large numbers of bowls and beakers. In 2023 and 2024 continued in Area H and in 2025 in Area G.

== Archaeological remains ==
=== Area A (Ibgal of Inanna) ===
Though commonly known as Area A or the Ibgal of Inanna, this temple complex was actually named Eanna during the Ur periods, while Inanna’s sanctuary within Eanna was known as Ibgal.

==== Level I architecture ====
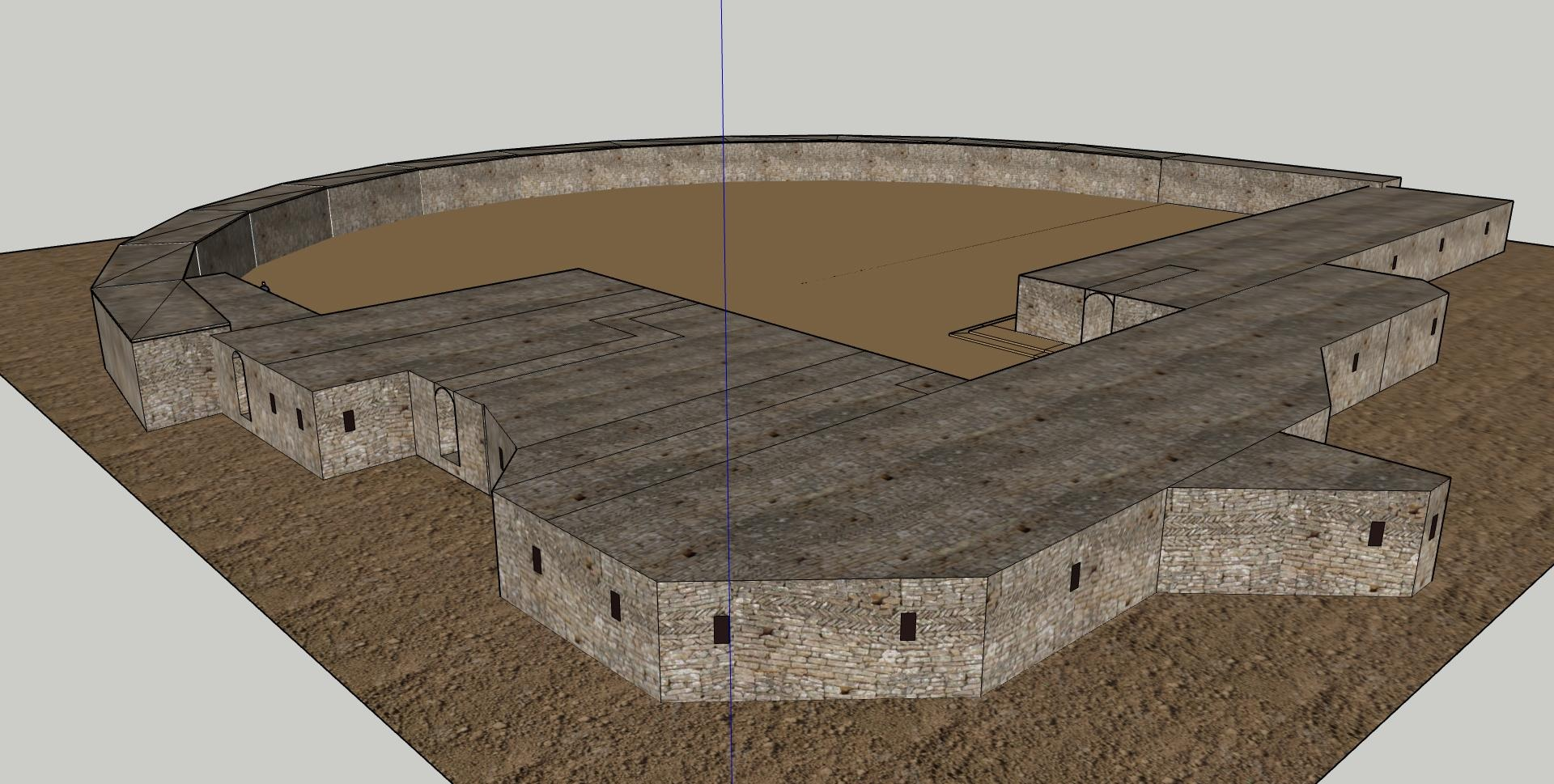
3-D reconstruction of Area A by Keifuhui (Front)

Level I of Area A was occupied from Early Dynastic (ED I) to Ur III. It was used for both daily worship activities and festive celebrations, particularly for the queen of Lagash during the Barley and Malt-eating festivals of Nanše.

Level I consists of an oval wall on the Northeast end, surrounding an extensive courtyard. The fragments, together comparison to another Sumerian temple at Khafajah, show that the wall should originally be approximately 130m long.

For the temple-building, it is connected to the courtyard with steps. Twenty-five rooms have been excavated inside the building, in which the western ones would open up to the outside of the temple with corridors and form a tripartite entrance. Both the temple-building and the oval wall were built with plano-convex mud bricks, which was a very common material up to the late Early Dynastic III period. Additionally, foundations are found under the temple-building. They are composed of rectangular areas of various sizes, some as solid mud bricks and some as cavities of broken pieces of alluvial mud and layers of sand, then capped again with mud bricks.

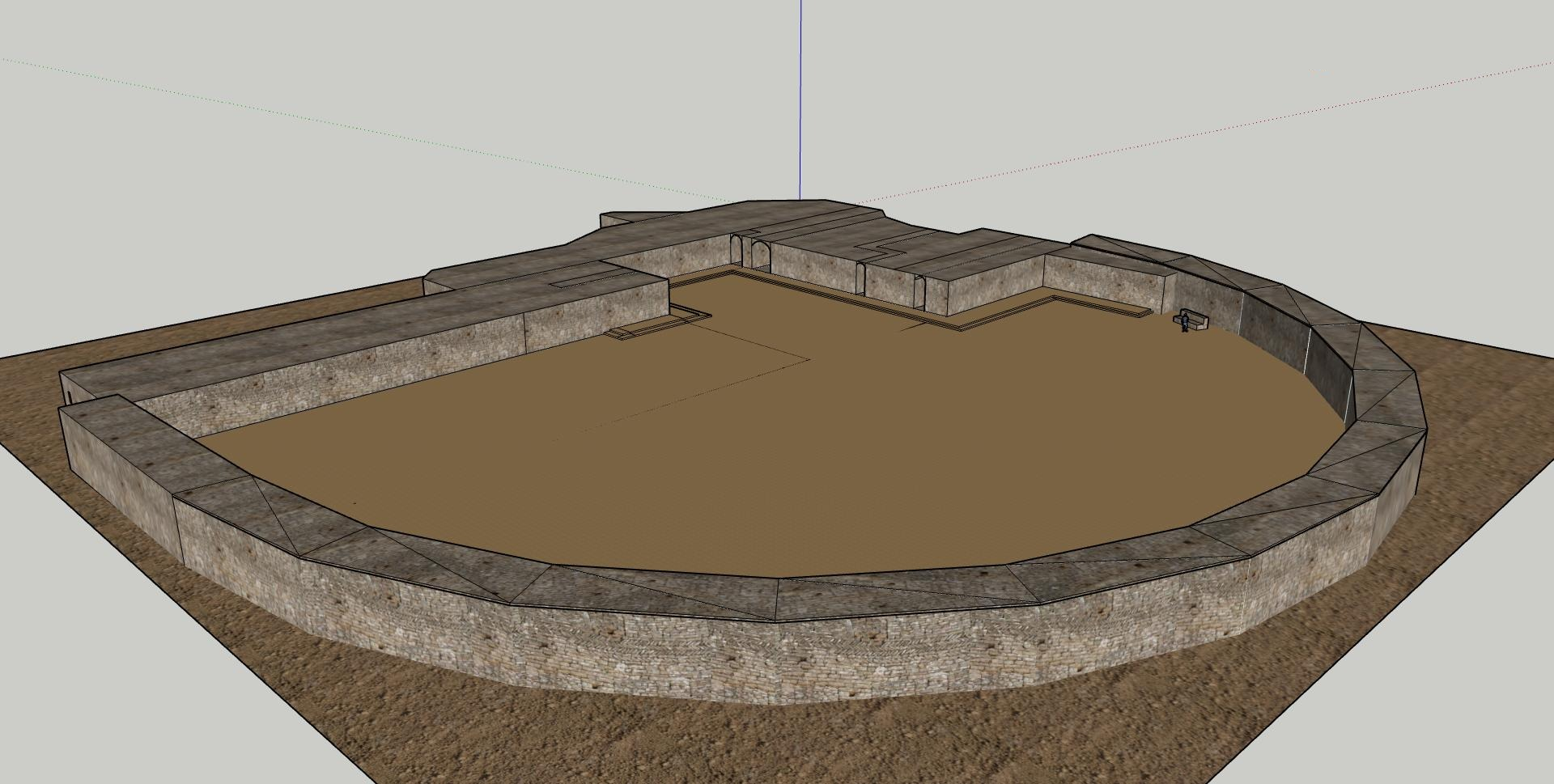
3-D reconstruction of Area A by Keifuhui

==== Level II and Level III architecture ====
Two more levels are present beneath Level I. All of them are similar to each other in terms of layout and construction materials. During the process of building on top of each other, workers at that time would choose to destroy some portions while keeping some others, leading to much open speculation as to the rationales behind.

=== Area B (3HB Building and 4HB Building at Bagara of Ningirsu) ===
==== The 3HB Building ====
Three building levels were discovered and 3HB III is the earliest and most well-preserved level. 3HB II and 3HB I shared the same layout with 3HB III. All three levels have a central niched-and-buttressed building which is surrounded by a low enclosure wall with unknown height.

Building Level	Building Material	Occupation Period	Notes
3HB III	Plano-convex bricks, mud plaster	ED IIIB (Eannatum’s rule or later)	Dimensions: 3HB Building: 24 x 20m Enclosure Wall: approximately 31m x 25m
3HB II	Plano-convex bricks, mud plaster	ED IIIB – Late Akkadian	
3HB I	Plano-convex bricks, mud plaster	Late – Post-Akkadian	

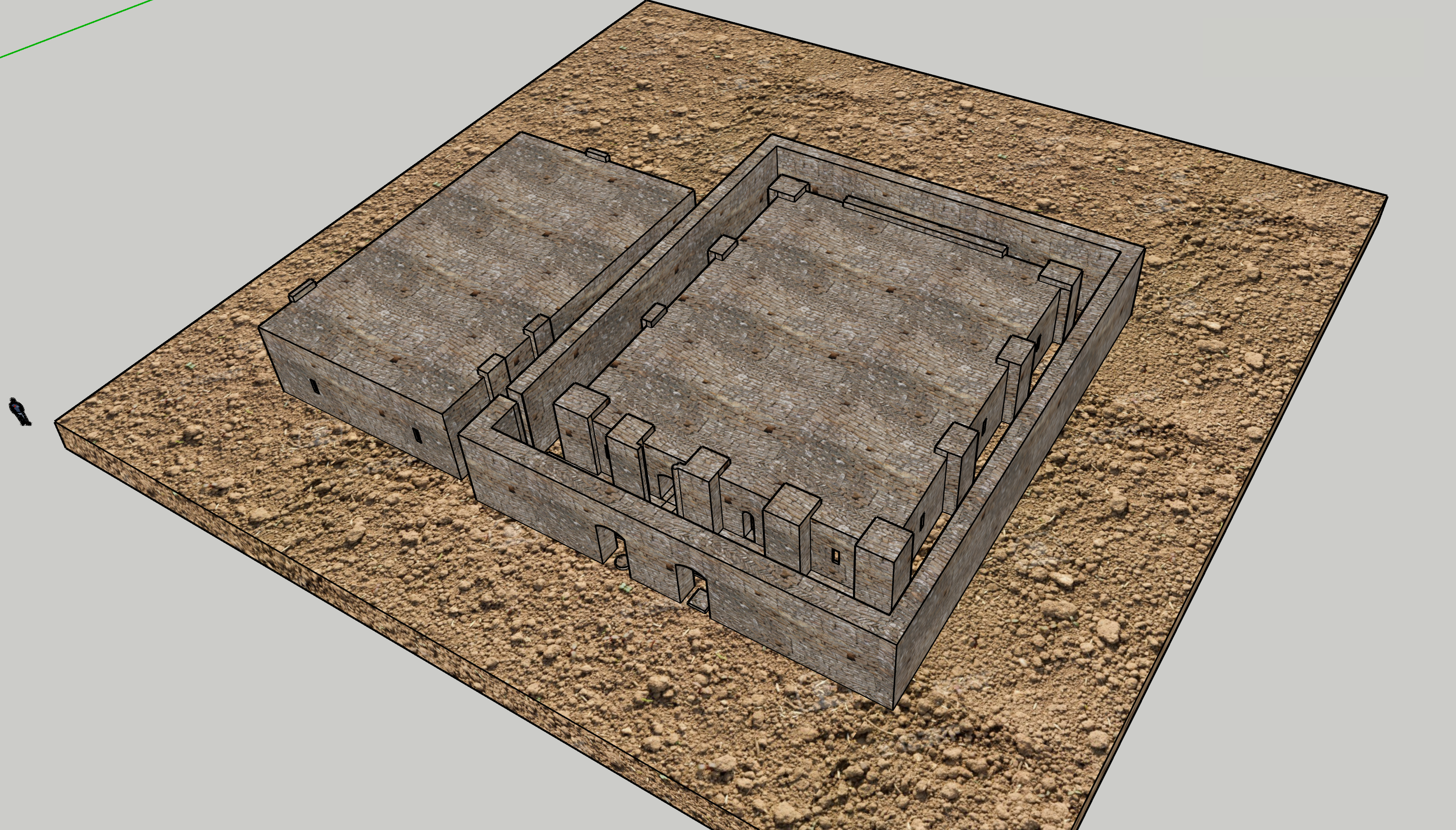
3-D reconstruction of Area B by Dcldeobi (Front)

An excavator believes that the 3HB Building was a “kitchen temple” that aimed at meeting some of the god’s demands. Alternatively, it has been suggested that the building was a shrine in the Bagara complex as it shared more similarities with other temples than kitchens in terms of layout, features and contents.

==== The 4HB Building ====
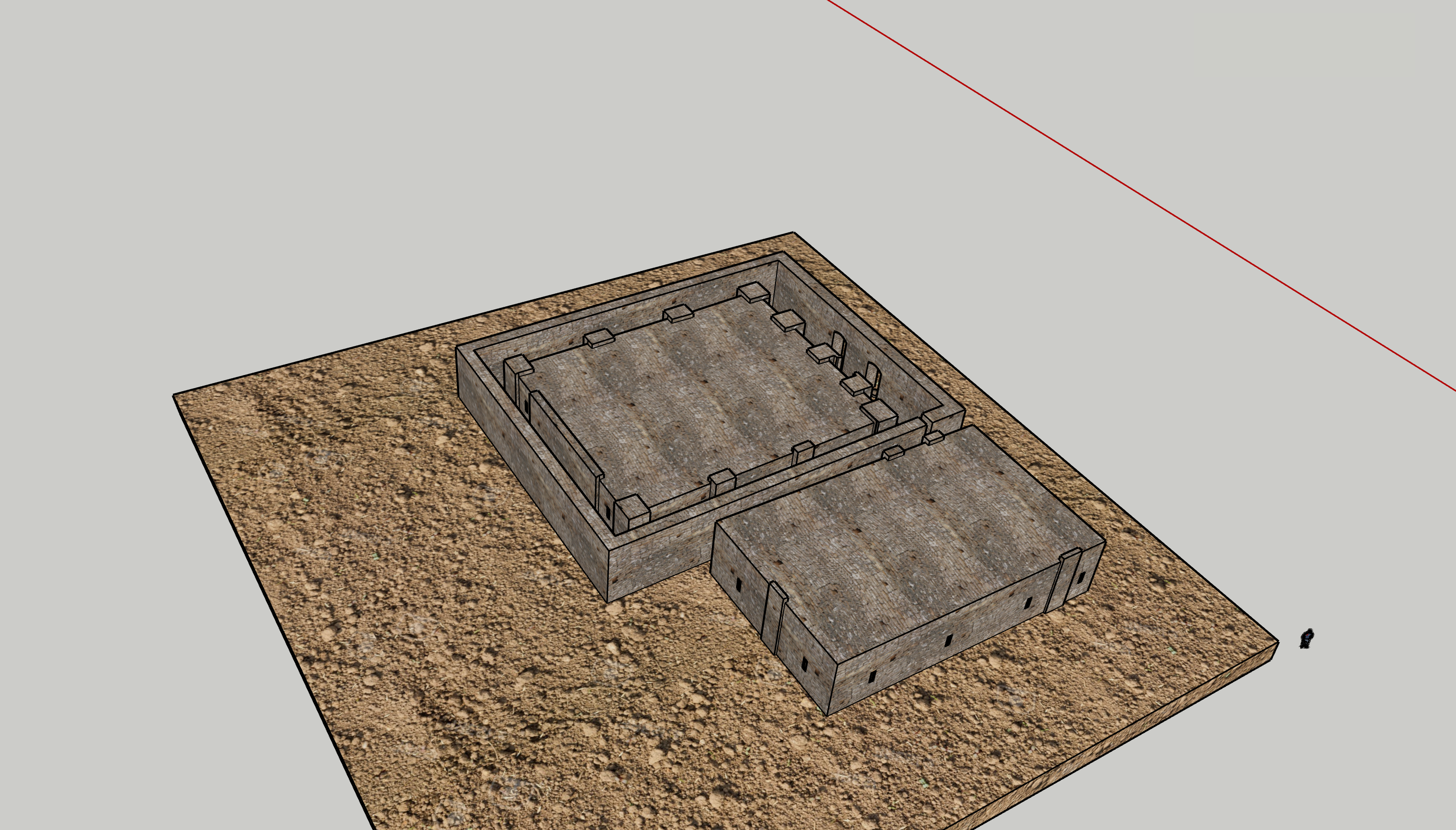
3-D reconstruction of Area B by Dcldeobi (Back)

The excavators discovered five building levels. The layout of 4HB V cannot be obtained due to limited exploration. 4HB IV-4HB I shared the same layout. 4HB IVB was the first level that was exposed completely.

Building Level	Building Material	Occupation Period	Notes
4HB V	Plano-convex bricks	ED III (Evidence from pottery)	
4HB IVA	Plano-convex bricks	ED III (Evidence from pottery)	
4HB IVB	Plano-convex bricks	ED IIIB	Dimensions: 4HB Building: 23 x 14m
4HB III	Plano-convex bricks	ED IIIB – Late Akkadian	
4HB II	Plano-convex bricks	Late – Post-Akkadian	
4HB I	Plano-convex bricks and flat, square bricks	Gudea’s rule	

It has been suggested that the 4HB Building is a brewery as ovens and storage vats and a tablet mentioning “the brewery” and “a brewer” were found. An alternate proposal is that 4HB building is a kitchen as it shared lots of similarities with temple kitchens at Ur and Nippur.

=== Area C ===
Located 360 meters southeast of Area B. It contains a large Early Dynastic administrative area with two building levels (1A and 1B). In level 1B were found sealing and tablets of Eanatum, Enanatum I, and Enmetena.

=== Area G ===
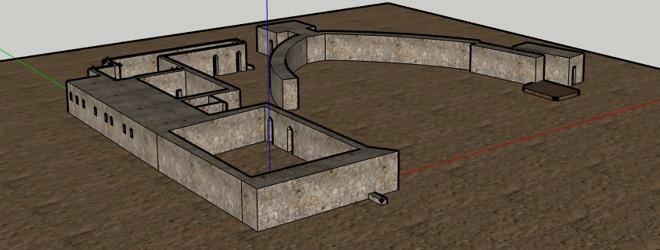
3-D reconstruction of Area G by Nic9137

Area G is located at the midway of Area B in the North and Area A in the South. First excavated by Dr Donald P. Hansen in season 3H, Area G consists of a building complex and a curving wall which are separated by around 30-40m.

==== Western Building Complex ====
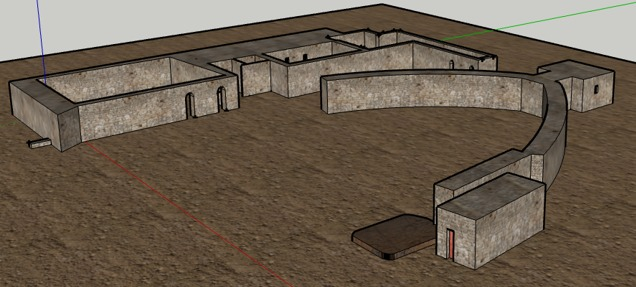
3-D reconstruction of Area G by Nic9137

5 building levels are found in the area. There is little information about Levels I and IIA as they were poorly preserved without sealed floor deposits. In Levels IIB, III and IV, changes can be found in the building complex with reconstructions. In Level III, benches are built near the eastern and northern courtyards. Sealings made in the “piedmont” style which are found in the rooms share a resemblance with the Seal Impression Strata of Ur and sealings from Inanna Temple at Nippur, indicating the administrative nature of the buildings. Apart from institutional objects, fireplaces, bins and pottery were found in the rooms as well.

==== Curving Wall (Eastern Zone) ====
A 2-m wide wall that runs from the south to the north is found on the eastern part of Area G. The features of the curving wall and the rooms found near it are determined to be different from other oval temples built in the Early Dynastic in other major states. Intrusive vertical drains are found at the base of the plano-convex foundation. Archaeologists excavated further deeper to the water level during season 4H and found extensive Early Dynastic I deposits.

== List of rulers ==
Although the first dynasty of Lagash has become well-known based on mentions in inscriptions contemporaneous with other dynasties from the Early Dynastic (ED) III period; it was not inscribed onto the Sumerian King List (SKL). The first dynasty of Lagash preceded the dynasty of Akkad in a time in which Lagash exercised considerable influence in the region. The following list should not be considered complete:

Portrait or inscription	Ruler	Approx. date and length of reign	Comments, notes, and references for mentions
Early Dynastic IIIa period (c. 2600 – c. 2500 BC)
Predynastic Lagash (c. 2600 – c. 2520 BC)
	(En-hegal) 𒂗𒃶𒅅	reigned c. 2570 BC (MC)	Historicity certain; Held the title of, "King of Lagash"; One inscription known, recording a purchase of land
	(Lugalshaengur) 𒈗𒊮𒇉	r. c. 2530 BC (MC)	Historicity certain; Held the title of, "Governor of Lagash"; temp. of Mesilim
Portrait or inscription	Ruler	Approx. date and length of reign (MC)	Comments, notes, and references for mentions
Early Dynastic IIIb period (c. 2500 – c. 2350 BC)
First dynasty of Lagash / Lagash I dynasty (c. 2520 – c. 2260 BC)
	Ur-Nanshe (Ur-nina) 𒌨𒀭𒀏	r. c. 2520 BC (MC)	Son of Gunidu; Held the title of, "King of Lagash"; temp. of Pabilgagaltuku
	Akurgal 𒀀𒆳𒃲	r. c. 2500 BC (MC) (9 years)	Son of Ur-Nanshe; Held the title of, "King of Lagash"; temp. of Ush
	Eannatum 𒂍𒀭𒈾𒁺	r. c. 2450 BC (MC) (27 years)	Grandson of Ur-Nanshe (?); Held the title of, "King of Kish"; temp. Enakalle
	Enannatum I 𒂗𒀭𒈾𒁺	r. c. 2425 BC (MC) (4 years)	Brother of Eannatum (?); Held the title of, "Governor of Lagash"; temp. Ur-Lumma
	Entemena 𒂗𒋼𒈨𒈾	r. c. 2420 BC (MC) (27 years)	Son of Enannatum I; Held the title of "Governor of Lagash".; temp. Il of Umma (r. c. 2420 BC).
	Enannatum II 𒂗𒀭𒈾𒁺	r. c. 2400 BC (MC) (5 years)	Son of Entemena.; Held the title of "Governor of Lagash".; temp. Gishakidu of Umma (r. c. 2400 BC).
	Enentarzi 𒂗𒇷𒋻𒍣	r. c. 2400 BC (MC) (5 years)	A priest of Lagash.; Held the title of "Governor of Lagash".; temp. Meanedu of Umma (r. c. 2400 BC).
	Lugalanda 𒈗𒀭𒁕	r. c. 2400 BC (MC) (6 years and 1 month)	Historicity certain.; Held the title of "Governor of Lagash".; temp. Lugal-kisalsi of Uruk (r. c. 2400 BC).
Proto-Imperial period (c. 2350 – c. 2260 BC)
	Urukagina 𒌷𒅗𒄀𒈾	r. c. 2350 BC (MC) (11 years)	Held the title of "King of Lagash".; Issued a proclamation of social reforms.; temp. Lugalzagesi of Umma (r. c. 2355 – c. 2316 BC).
	Meszi	Uncertain; these two rulers may have r. c. 2342 – c. 2260 BC sometime during the Proto-Imperial period.	temp. Sargon of Akkad (r. c. 2335 – c. 2279 BC).
	Kitushi	Uncertain; these two rulers may have r. c. 2342 – c. 2260 BC sometime during the Proto-Imperial period.	Held the title of "Governor of Lagash".; temp. Rimush of Akkad (r. c. 2279 – c. 2270 BC).
Portrait or inscription	Ruler	Approx. date and length of reign	Comments, notes, and references for mentions
Akkadian period (c. 2260 – c. 2154 BC)
Second dynasty of Lagash / Lagash II dynasty (c. 2260 – c. 2023 BC)
	Ki-Ku-Id	r. c. 2260 BC (MC)	
	Engilsa	r. c. 2250 BC (MC)	
	Ur-A	r. c. 2230 BC (MC)	
	(Lugal-ushumgal) 𒈗𒃲𒁔	r. c. 2230 – c. 2210 BC (MC)	Historicity certain.; Held the title of "Governor of Lagash".; temp. Naram-Sin of Akkad (r. c. 2254 – c. 2218 BC).
	(Puzer-Mama) 𒅤𒊭𒀭𒈠𒈠	Uncertain; these seven rulers may have r. c. 2210 – c. 2164 BC sometime during the Akkadian period.	Held the title of "King of Lagash".; temp. Shar-Kali-Sharri of Akkad (r. c. 2218 – c. 2193 BC).; Wrested independence from the Akkadian empire.
	Ur-Ningirsu I 𒌨𒀭𒎏𒄈𒍪	Uncertain; these seven rulers may have r. c. 2210 – c. 2164 BC sometime during the Akkadian period.	
	Ur-Mama	Uncertain; these seven rulers may have r. c. 2210 – c. 2164 BC sometime during the Akkadian period.	
	Ur-Utu	Uncertain; these seven rulers may have r. c. 2210 – c. 2164 BC sometime during the Akkadian period.	
	Lu-Baba	Uncertain; these seven rulers may have r. c. 2210 – c. 2164 BC sometime during the Akkadian period.	
	Lugula 𒇽𒄖𒆷	Uncertain; these seven rulers may have r. c. 2210 – c. 2164 BC sometime during the Akkadian period.	
	Kaku 𒅗𒆬	Uncertain; these seven rulers may have r. c. 2210 – c. 2164 BC sometime during the Akkadian period.	
	Ur-Baba 𒌨𒀭𒁀𒌑	r. c. 2164 – c. 2144 BC (MC)	Historicity certain.; Held the title of "King of Lagash".; temp. Shu-turul of Akkad (r. c. 2168 – c. 2154 BC).
Gutian period (c. 2154 – c. 2119 BC)
	Gudea 𒅗𒌤𒀀	r. c. 2144 – c. 2124 BC (MC) r. c. 2080 – c. 2060 BC (SC)	Son-in-law of Ur-Baba.; Held the title of "Governor of Lagash".; temp. Ishtup-Ilum of Mari (r. c. 2147 – c. 2136 BC).
	Ur-Ningirsu II 𒌨𒀭𒎏𒄈𒍪	r. c. 2124 – c. 2119 BC (MC) r. c. 2060 – c. 2055 BC (SC)	Son of Gudea.; Historicity certain.; Held the title of "Governor of Lagash".
	Pirig-me 𒊊𒀞	r. c. 2119 – c. 2117 BC (MC) r. c. 2055 – c. 2053 BC (SC)	Son of Ur-Ningirsu.; Historicity certain.; Held the title of "Governor of Lagash".
	Ur-gar 𒌨𒃻	r. c. 2117 – c. 2113 BC (MC) r. c. 2053 – c. 2049 BC (SC)	Son-in-law of Ur-Baba.; Historicity certain.; Held the title of "Governor of Lagash".
Ur III period (c. 2119 – c. 2004 BC)
	Nam-mahani 𒉆𒈤𒉌	r. c. 2113 – c. 2110 BC (MC) r. c. 2049 – c. 2046 BC (SC)	Grandson of Kaku.; Held the title of "Governor of Lagash".; temp. Ur-Nammu of Ur (r. c. 2112 – c. 2094 BC).
	Ur-Ninsuna	r. c. 2090 – c. 2080 BC (MC)	
	Ur-Nikimara	r. c. 2080 – c. 2070 BC (MC)	
	Lu-Kirilaza	r. c. 2070 – c. 2050 BC (MC)	
	Ir-Nanna	r. c. 2050 – c. 2023 BC (MC)	

== See also ==
- List of cities of the ancient Near East
- List of Mesopotamian dynasties
- The Sumerian Game
