= Balulu =

Balulu 𒁀𒇻𒇻
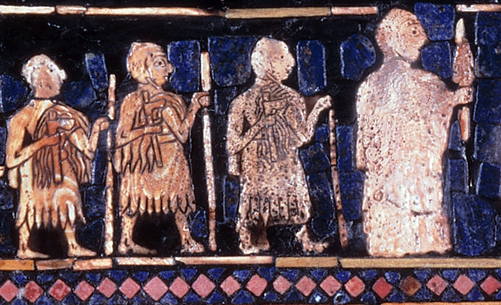
- King at war leading soldiers, from the Standard of Ur

King of Ur
- Reign: c. 2440 BC
- Predecessor: Possibly Elulu
- Successor: Possibly A'annepada
- House: First Dynasty of Ur

Location of Ur

Balulu (Sumerian: 𒁀𒇻𒇻, ba-lu-lu; fl. c. 2440 BC) was the final king of the First Dynasty of Ur, according to the Sumerian King List, which states he ruled for 36 years:

"... Mesh-ki-ang-Nanna, son of Mesannepada, was king, 36 years he ruled; Elulu, 25 years he ruled; Balulu, 36 years he ruled; 4 kings, the years: 171(?) they ruled. Ur with weapons was struck down; the kingship to Awan was carried off.

— Sumerian King List, 137-147.

Both his reign and the dynasty came to an end when he was defeated by a king of Awan.

Regnal titles
Preceded by Elulu of Ur	King of Sumer c. 2440 BC	Succeeded by Possibly A'annepada
Preceded by Possibly Elulu	Ensí of Ur c. 2440 BC	Succeeded by Possibly A'annepada
