= Elulu =

Elulu 𒂊𒇻𒇻
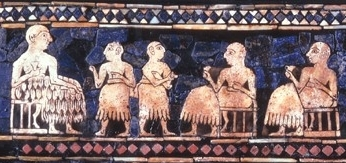
- King at peace, with attendants, from the Standard of Ur

King of Ur
- Reign: c. 2445 BC
- Predecessor: Possibly Mesh-ki-ang-Nanna
- Successor: Possibly Balulu
- House: First Dynasty of Ur

Location of Ur

Elulu (Sumerian: 𒂊𒇻𒇻, e-lu-lu; fl. c. 2445 BC) is listed as the third king of the First Dynasty of Ur on the Sumerian king list, which states he reigned for 25 years.

One early inscription for an "Elulu (or Elili), king of Ur" was found at nearby Eridu, stating that this king had built up the abzu ziggurat for Enki.

Some scholars have further connected Elulu with the "Elilina" who was said to be the father of the later king Enshakushanna of Uruk, but this theory is uncertain, owing to chronological difficulties. The inscription states that Enshakushanna's father was "Elilina", possibly King Elulu of Ur:

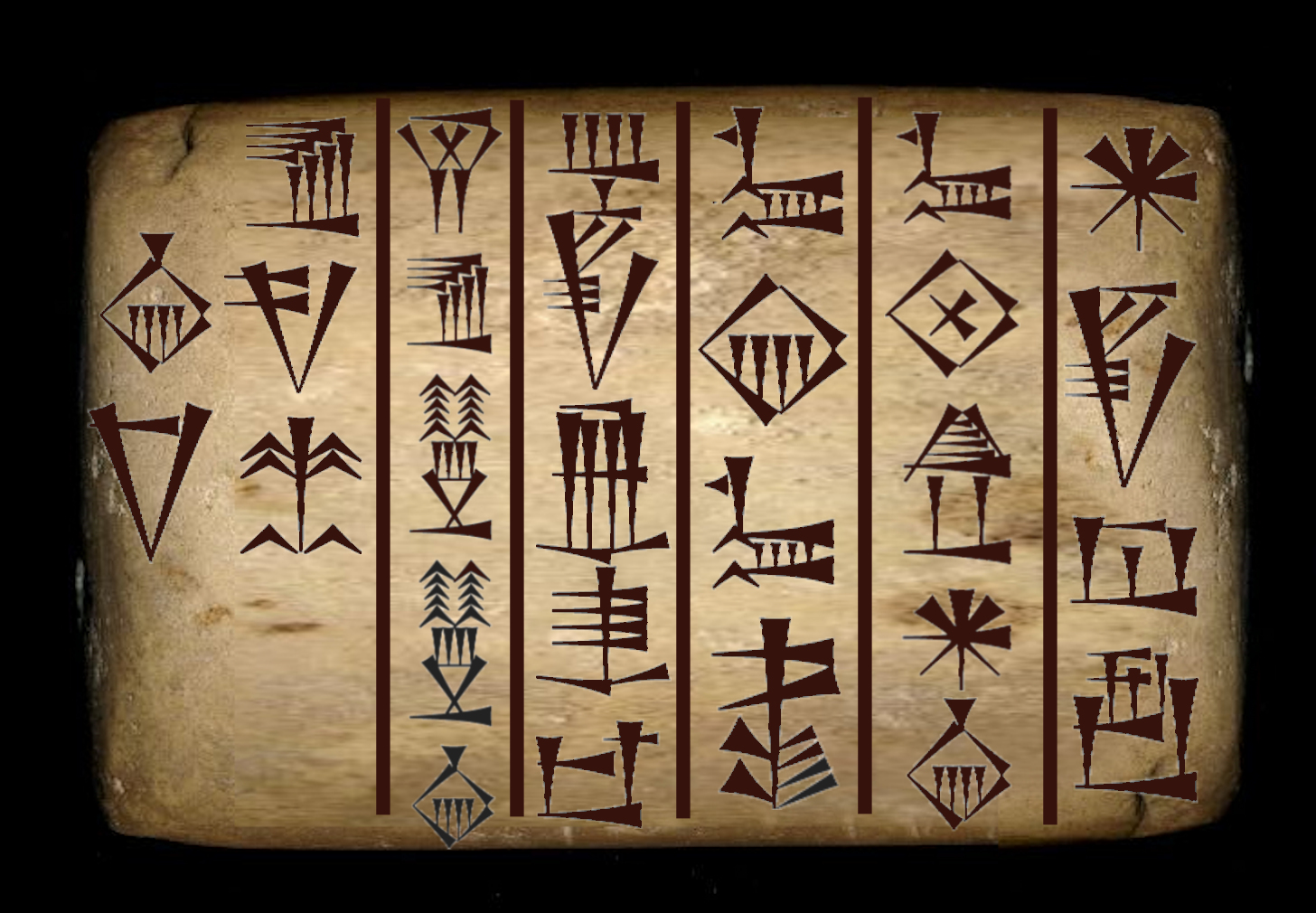
Dedication tablet by King Enshakushanna, State Hermitage Museum, St. Petersburg, Erm 14375 (reconstitution)

𒀭𒇽𒆪𒊏 / 𒂗𒊮𒊨𒀭𒈾 /𒂗 𒆠𒂗𒄀 / 𒈗 𒌦𒈣 / 𒌉𒂍𒇷𒇷𒈾 / 𒂍𒉌𒈬𒈾𒆕
^{D}LU2-KU-ra / en-sha3-kush2-an-na / en ki-en-gi / lugal kalam-ma / dumu e2-li-li-na#? / e2-ni mu-na-du3

"For ... (unknown god): Enshakushanna, lord of Sumer and king of all the land, son of Elilina, built the temple for Him."

— Dedication tablet by King Enshakushanna, State Hermitage Museum, St. Petersburg, Erm 14375.

== See also ==
- History of Sumer

Regnal titles
Preceded by Possibly Mesh-ki-ang-Nanna	Ensi of Ur c. 2445 BC	Succeeded by Possibly Balulu
