= Ur =

Ancient Mesopotamian city-state

- Sumerian: 𒋀𒀕𒆠
- Location within Iraq Location within Near East
- 30°57′42″N 46°06′18″E
- Type: Settlement
- Periods: Ubaid period to Iron Age
- Cultures: Sumerian
- Location: Tell el-Muqayyar, Dhi Qar Governorate, Iraq
- Region: Mesopotamia, Middle East

History
- Built: c. 3800 BC
- Abandoned: After 500 BC

Site notes
- Excavation dates: 1853–1854, 1922–1934, 2015-present
- Archaeologists: John George Taylor, Charles Leonard Woolley, Elizabeth C Stone, Paul Zimansky, Adelheid Otto

UNESCO World Heritage Site
- Official name: Ur Archaeological City
- Part of: Ahwar of Southern Iraq
- Criteria: Mixed: (iii)(v)(ix)(x)
- Reference: 1481-006
- Inscription: 2016 (40th Session)
- Area: 71 ha (0.27 sq mi)
- Buffer zone: 317 ha (1.22 sq mi)

Ur (Note: Sumerian: 𒌶𒆠, 𒋀𒀕𒆠, or 𒋀𒀊𒆠, (Note: Literal transliteration: Urim_{2} = ŠEŠ. ABgunu = ŠEŠ.UNUG (𒋀𒀕) and Urim_{5} = ŠEŠ.AB (𒋀𒀊), where ŠEŠ=URI_{3} (The Electronic Text Corpus of Sumerian Literature.)) romanized: Urim; Akkadian: 𒋀𒀕𒆠, romanized: Uru; Arabic: أُور, romanized: ʾŪr; Hebrew: אוּר, romanized: ʾŪr.) (/ʊr/ or /ɜːr/) was a major Sumerian city-state in ancient Mesopotamia, located at the site of modern Tell el-Muqayyar (Note: Also variously transcribed as Tell el-Mugheir, Tell el-Mughair, Tell el-Moghair, etc., based on the local Iraqi Arabic pronunciation.) (Arabic: تَلّ ٱلْمُقَيَّر, lit. 'mound of bitumen') in Dhi Qar Governorate, Iraq. Although Ur was a coastal city near the mouth of the Euphrates on the Persian Gulf, the coastline has shifted and the site is now well inland, on the south bank of the Euphrates, 16 km (10 mi) southwest of the city of Nasiriyah. The city dates from the Ubaid period c. 3800 BC, and is recorded in written history as a city-state from the 26th century BC, its first recorded king being Mesannepada.

The city's patron deity was the moon god Nanna (Sin in Akkadian), and the name of the city is derived from UNUG^{KI}, literally "the abode (of Nanna)". The site is marked by the partially restored ruins of the Ziggurat of Ur, which contained the shrine of Nanna, excavated in the 1930s. The temple was built in the 21st century BC, during the reign of Ur-Nammu and was reconstructed in the 6th century BC by Nabonidus, the last king of Babylon. In recent years, Ur Tourist City, a modern heritage and tourism district, has been developed adjacent to the site to accommodate tourists and pilgrims.

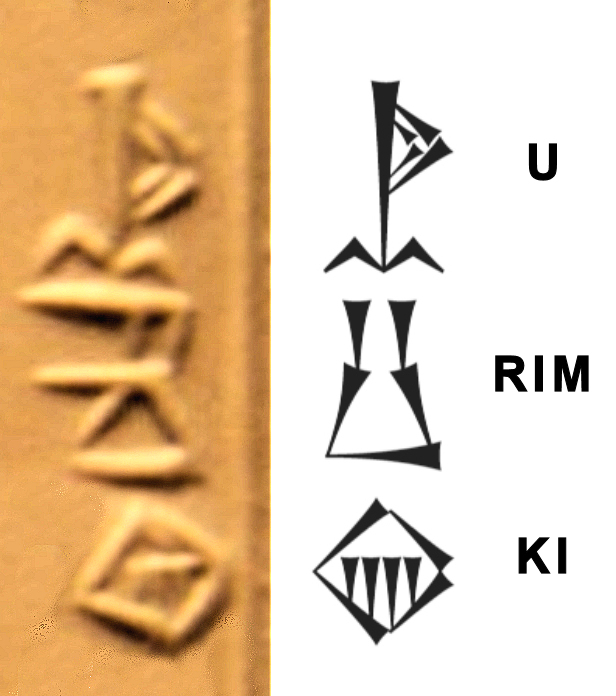
The name 𒋀𒀊𒆠 URIM_{5}^{KI} for "Country of Ur" on a seal of King Ur-Nammu

== Society and culture ==
Archaeological discoveries have shown that Ur was a major Sumerian urban center on the Mesopotamian plain. The discovery of Ur's Royal Tombs further confirmed this. These tombs, which date to the Early Dynastic IIIa period (approximately in the 25th or 24th century BC), contained many luxury items made of precious metals and semi-precious stones imported from long distances (Ancient Iran, Afghanistan, India, Asia Minor, the Levant and the Persian Gulf). This immense wealth shows Ur's economic importance during the Early Bronze Age.

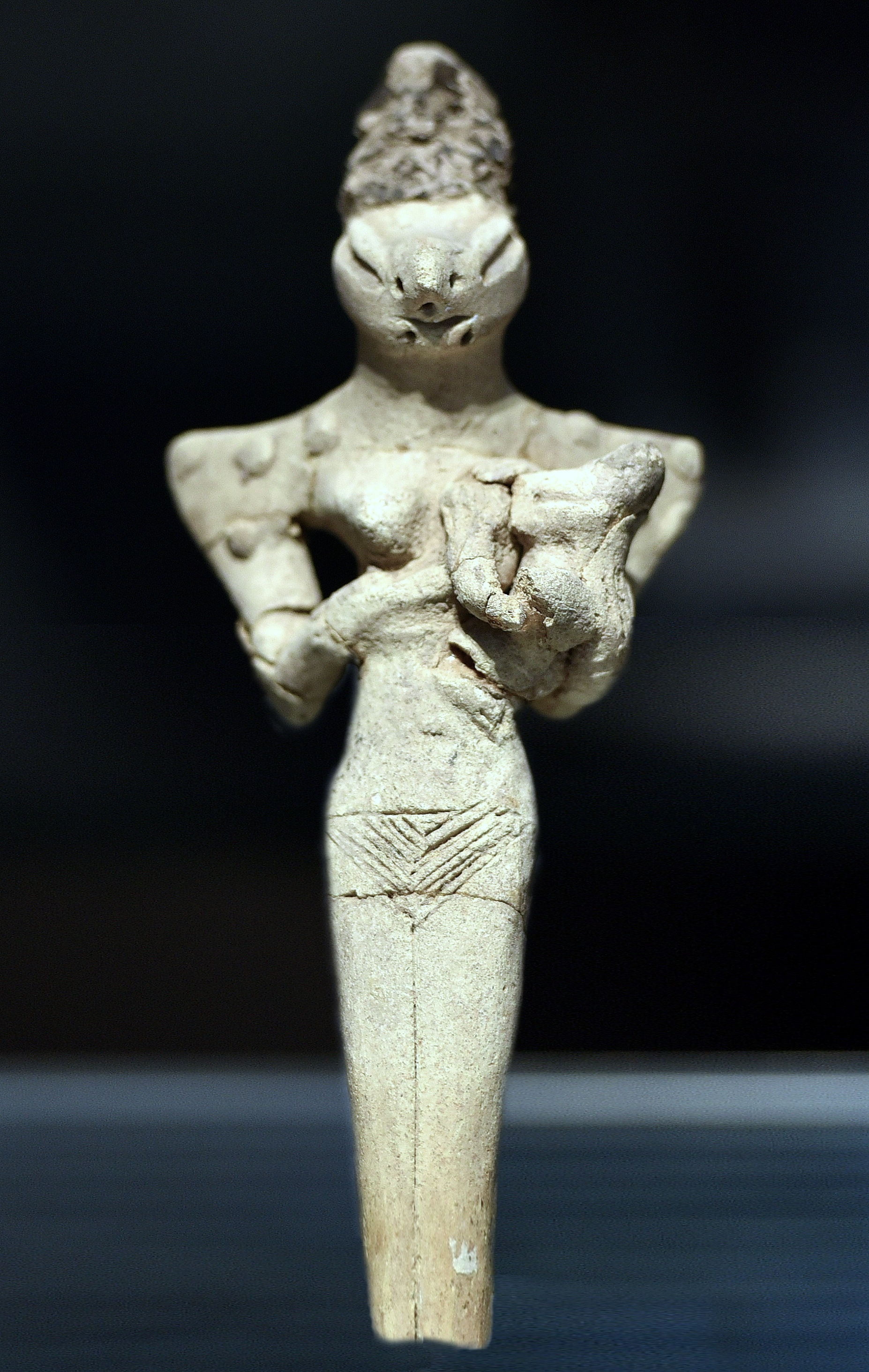
Lizard-headed nude woman nursing a child, from Ur, Ubaid period, c. 4500–4000 BC; Iraq Museum

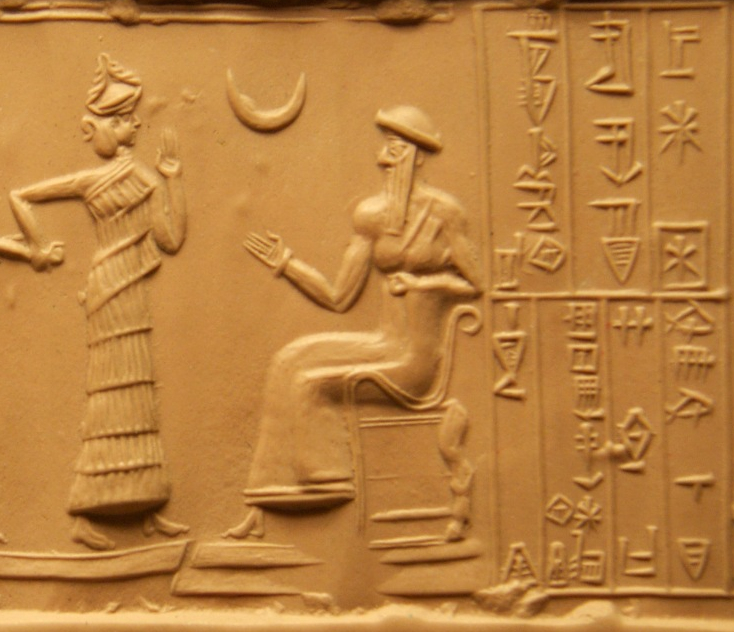
Enthroned King Ur-Nammu (c. 2047–2030 BC)

Excavation in the old city of Ur in 1928 revealed the Lyres of Ur, instruments similar to the modern harp but in the shape of a bull and with eleven strings.

Ur was an important religious center in ancient Mesopotamia. It was home to the Temple of Inanna, a prominent religious site. When Ur was conquered by Sargon of Akkad, he appointed his daughter, Enheduanna, as high priestess of Nanna, the Mesopotamian moon god. Control over the priesthood of Nanna remained a symbolic marker of political control over the region of Babylon for five centuries following Sargon's reign.

Ur was also a significant city-state with regard to the production of Sumerian literature. The potential first identifiable author in world history, Enheduanna, composed hymns to various Mesopotamian deities, such as The Exaltation of Inanna, during her time as a high priestess in Ur; however, Assyriologists are unsure whether Enheduanna composed the hymns herself or if a scribe composed them on her behalf. During the Ur-III period, hymns praising rulers and heroes became a popular literary genre, although only copies from later periods survive. Toward the end of the Ur-III period, a series of poems lamenting the decline of Ur were produced, with the famous Lament over the destruction of Sumer and Ur detailing the capture of King Ibbi-Sin by the Elamites.

Standard of Ur mosaic (c. 2600 BC)
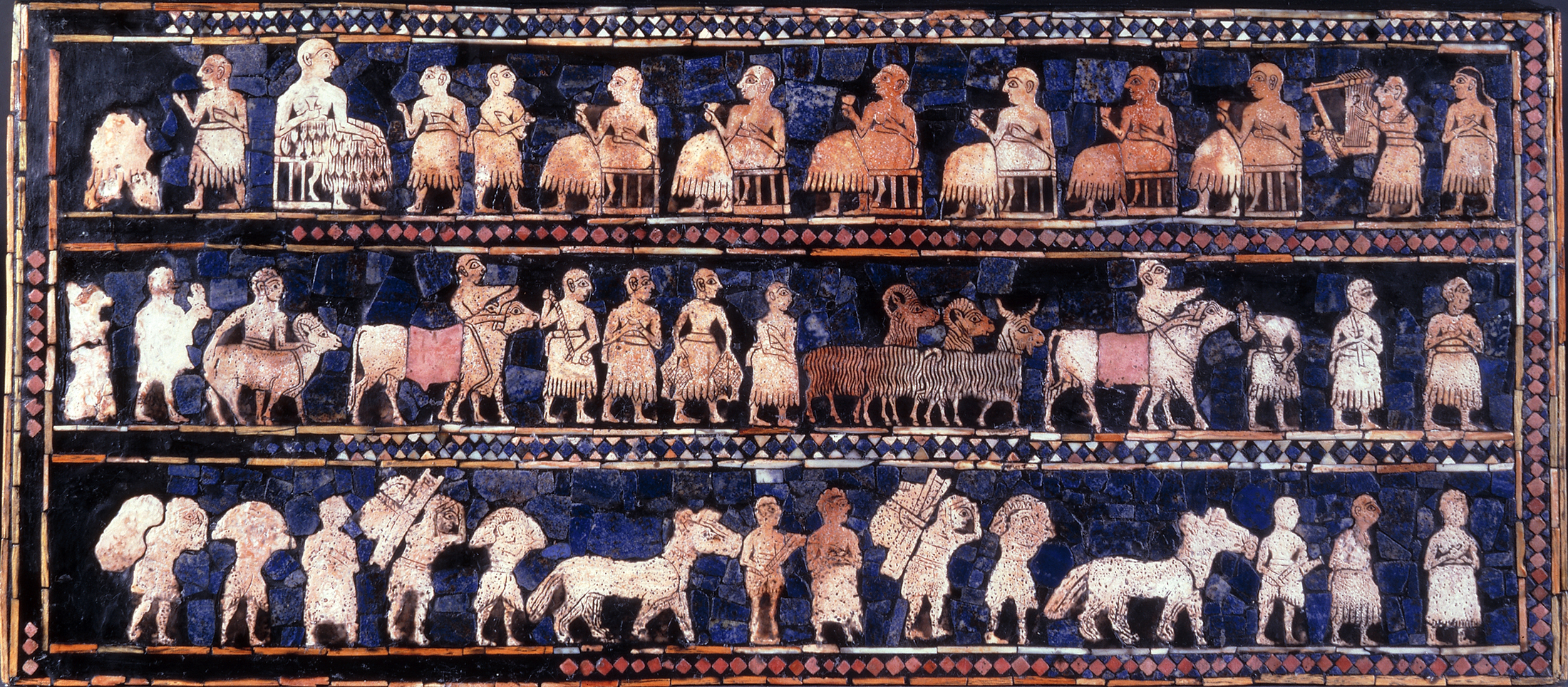
The Standard of Ur mosaic, from the royal tombs of Ur, is made of red limestone, bitumen, lapis lazuli, and shell. The "peace" side shows comfort, music, and prosperity. The "war" side shows the king, his armies, and chariots trampling on enemies.

== History ==
The site consists of a mound, roughly 1200 by 800 metres with a height of about 20 metres above the plain. The mound is split by the remnants of an ancient canal into north and south portions. The remains of a city wall are visible surrounding the site. The occupation size ranged from about 15 hectares in the Jemdet Nasr period to 90 hectares in the Early Dynastic period and then peaking in the Ur III period at 108 hectares and the Isin-Larsa period at 140 hectares, extending beyond the city walls. Subsequent period had varying lesser degrees of occupation.

=== Prehistory ===
When Ur was founded, it was near the coastline of the Persian Gulf. Ur is thought, therefore, to have had marshy surroundings; irrigation would have been unnecessary, and the city's evident canals likely were used for transportation. Fish, birds, tubers, and reeds might have supported Ur economically without the need for an agricultural revolution sometimes hypothesized as a prerequisite to urbanization.

==== Prehistoric Ubaid period ====
Archaeologists have discovered evidence of early occupation at Ur during the Ubaid period (c. 5500–3700 BC), a prehistoric period of Mesopotamia. The name derives from Tell al-'Ubaid where the earliest large excavation of Ubaid period material was conducted initially in 1919 by Henry Hall and later by Leonard Woolley.

Later, a layer of soil covered the occupation levels from the Ubaid period. Excavators of the 1920s interpreted the layer of soil as evidence for the Great Flood of the Epic of Gilgamesh and Book of Genesis. However, later carbon dating complicated things, as it suggested that similar layers of sediment at the sites of different Sumerian cities were from different dates. In either case, the South Mesopotamian plain was exposed to regular floods from the Euphrates and the Tigris rivers, with heavy erosion from water and wind, which may have given rise to the Mesopotamian and derivative Biblical Great Flood stories.

=== Early Bronze Age ===
There are various main sources informing scholars about the importance of Ur during the Early Bronze Age.

==== Early Dynastic period II ====
Proto-cuneiform tablets from the Early Dynastic period, c. 2900 BC, have been recovered.

==== Early Dynastic period III ====
The First Dynasty of Ur seems to have had great wealth and power, as shown by the lavish remains of the Royal Cemetery at Ur. The Sumerian King List provides a tentative political history of ancient Sumer and mentions, among others, several rulers of Ur. Mesannepada is the first king mentioned in the Sumerian King List, and appears to have lived in the 26th century BC; a cylinder with his name inscribed upon it was discovered at the Royal Cemetery. Five more kings followed until the First Dynasty came to an end, with the Kings List stating that the kingship of Ur was usurped by the city of Awan.

Little is known about the period between the First Dynasty and the Akkadian period. According to interpretations of archaeological and textual evidence from this period by Assyriologists such as C.J. Gadd and Marc van de Mieroop, it appears that Ur, as well as much of its neighboring cities, came under the control of the city of Lagash in the 25th century BC, ruled by king Eannatum. His successor, Enannatum I, left behind memorials to demonstrate the fact that Ur remained under his control. Following the reign of Enannatum II, the power of Lagash declined, although Ur remained under the control of Lagashite kings. Around 2400 BC, Lugalkinishedudu, a king of Uruk, proclaimed himself king of Ur.[4] Lugalzagesi, the king of Umma, united southern Babylonia in 24th century BC, and was the last Sumerian king of the region before the conquest of Sargon of Akkad.[5]

Empire of the Third Dynasty of Ur. West is at top, north at right.

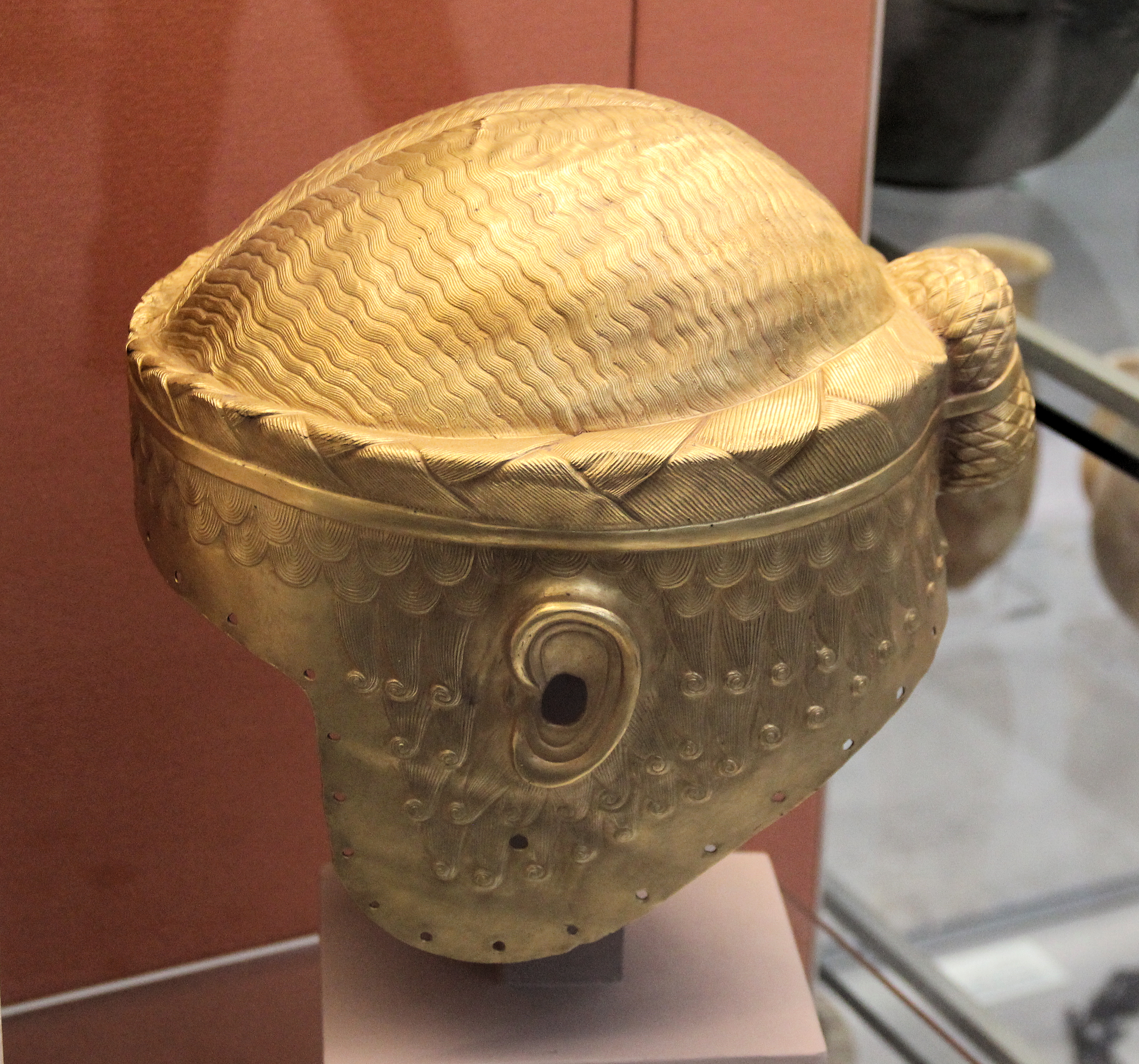
Gold helmet of King of Ur I Meskalamdug, c. 2600–2500 BC

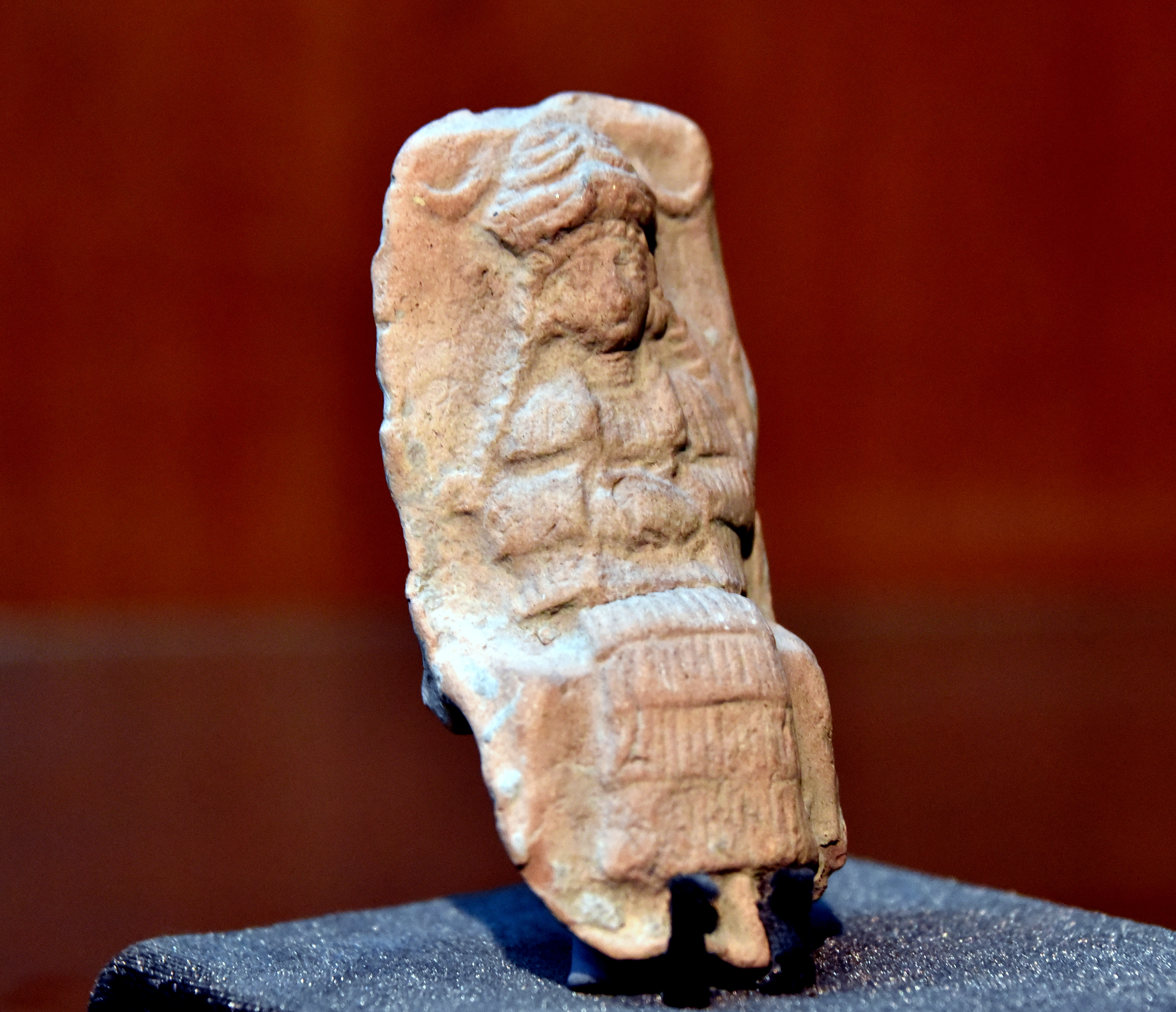
Mesopotamian female deity seated on a chair, Old-Babylonian fired clay plaque from Ur

Sumer and Elam c. 2350 BC. Ur was located close to the coastline near the mouth of the Euphrates.

==== Akkadian period ====
Ur came under the control of the Semitic-speaking Akkadian Empire (c. 2334–2154 BC) founded by Sargon the Great between the 24th and 22nd centuries BC. This was a period when the Semitic-speaking Akkadians, who had entered Mesopotamia in approximately 3000 BC, gained ascendancy over the Sumerians, and indeed much of the ancient Near East. The Akkadians imposed their language upon the Sumerian-speaking population of Southern Babylonia, leading to the adaptation of cuneiform script in order to accommodate the Akkadian language's grammar. Ur was an important southern Babylonian city within the Akkadian Empire. It served the empire's hub in southern Babylonia. Sargon installed his daughter Enheduanna as high priestess of Nanna, an act which historians such as Marc van de Mieroop interpret as a symbolic act for Sargon to legitimize his rule and exert political power over southern Babylonia. However, Sargon's conquest was resisted by southern Babylonia. His successor and son, Rimush, had to put down a revolt led by a local ruler of Ur. This rebellion was crushed and according to an inscription, 8,040 men were killed, 5,460 were taken as prisoners, and the leaders of the rebellion were captured. Sargon's son, Rimush, dedicated vessels captured during his campaign in Elam to the gods at Ur. Naram-Sim, the fourth ruler of the Akkadian Empire, is known to have established triumphal inscriptions at Ur that were copied by scribal students for centuries after. The Akkadian period came to an end in the 22nd century BC during the reign of Sharkalisharri due to both internal and external pressures, particularly from a people known as the Gutians who are thought to have come from the Zagros Mountains. It is still unknown as to whether Ur became ruled by a Gutian king or returned to being ruled by a local governor.

==== Ur III period ====
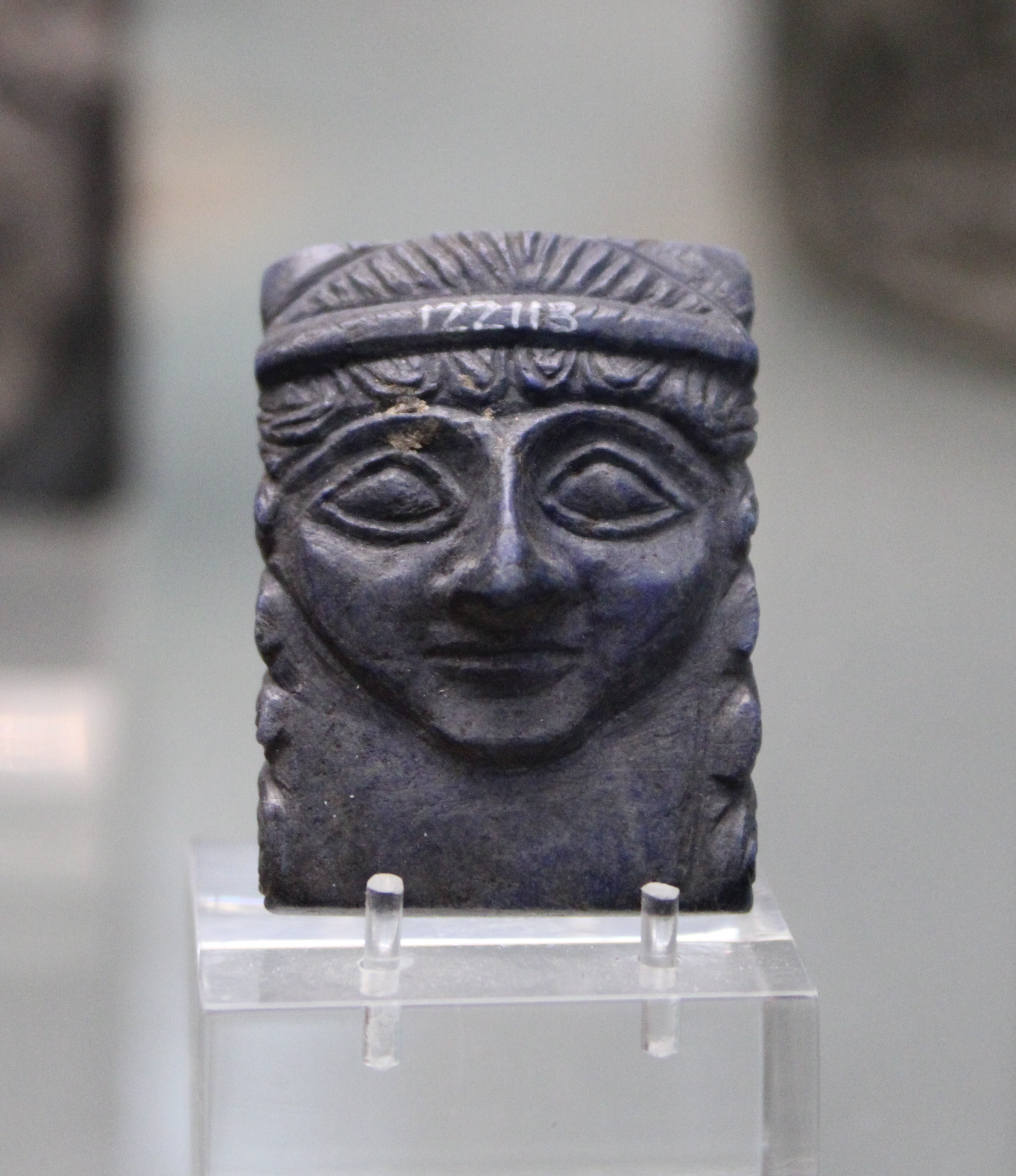
Plaque with woman's face BM 122113

Shortly after the decline of the Akkadian Empire, Ur once again fell under the influence of Lagash. Lagashite king Ur-Bau appointed his son Enannipadda. His successor, Gudea, mentioned in his inscriptions the extensive building activities that took place in Ur during his reign. In the 21st century BC, Utu-hengal, a king of Uruk, drove the Gutians out of southern Babylonia and took control of the region. Upon his death, his governor of Ur by the name of Ur-Nammu moved the kingship to the city, ruling between c. 2047 BC and 2030 BC. During his rule, temples, including the Ziggurat of Ur, were built, and agriculture was improved through irrigation. His code of laws, the Code of Ur-Nammu (a fragment was identified in Istanbul in 1952) is one of the oldest such documents known, preceding the Code of Hammurabi by 300 years. He and his successor Shulgi were both deified during their reigns, and after his death he continued as a hero-figure: one of the surviving works of Sumerian literature describes the death of Ur-Nammu and his journey to the underworld.

Ur-Nammu was succeeded by Shulgi, the greatest king of the Third Dynasty of Ur, who solidified the hegemony of Ur and reformed the empire into a highly centralized bureaucratic state. Shulgi ruled for a long time (at least 42 years) and deified himself halfway through his rule.

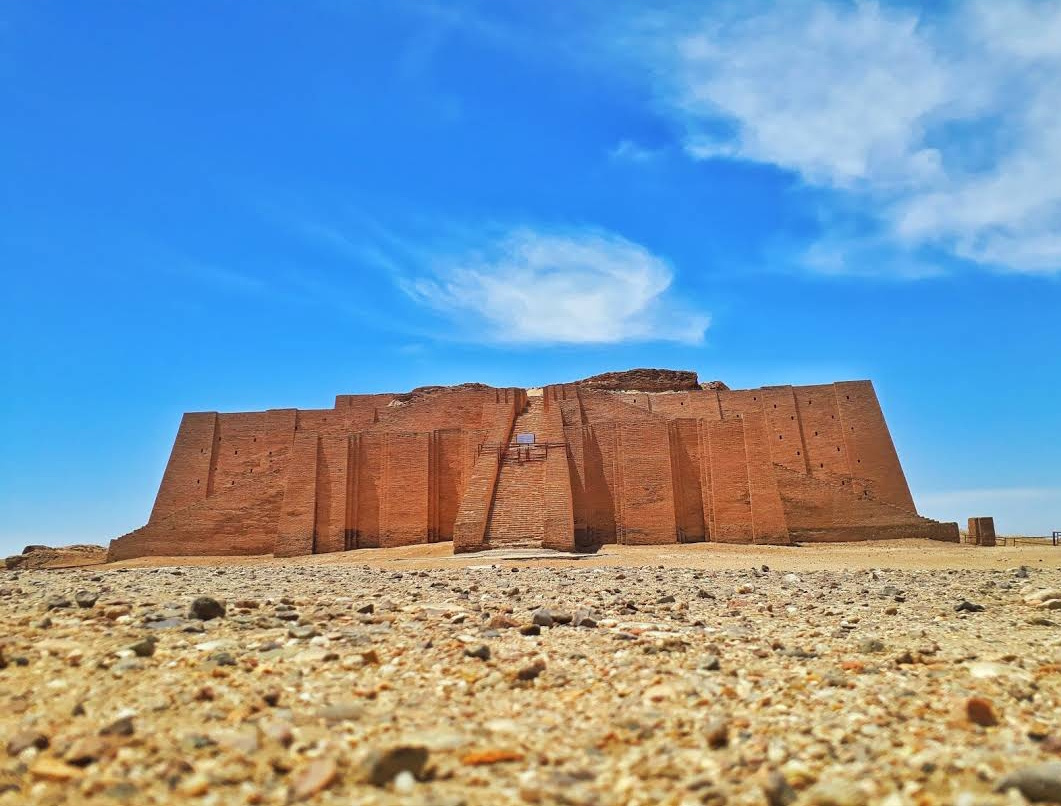
Ziggurat of Ur

The Ur empire continued through the reigns of three more kings with Akkadian names, Amar-Sin, Shu-Sin, and Ibbi-Sin. It fell around 1940 BC to the Elamites in the 24th regnal year of Ibbi-Sin, an event commemorated by the Lament for Ur.

According to one estimate, Ur was the largest city in the world from c. 2030 to 1980 BC. Its population was approximately 65,000 (or 0.1 per cent share of global population then).

=== Middle Bronze Age ===
The site was occupied in the Isin-Larsa and Old Babylonian periods. The city of Ur lost its political power after the demise of the Third Dynasty of Ur. While Ur's significance within the Near East continued into the Isin-Larsa period, interpretations of archaeological evidence suggest that the city was severely damaged in the aftermath of attacks by the Elamites. Following the decline of Isin, Ur fell under the influence of the kings of Larsa, who initiated several major rebuilding projects in Ur which included additional structures added to the ziggurat. Ur became the second capital of Larsa's dominion. In the 19th century BC during the reign of Rim-Sin I, Ur was conquered by king Hammurabi of the Old Babylonian Empire. During the Old Babylonian Empire, in the reign of Samsu-iluna, Ur was abandoned. It later became a part of the native Sealand Dynasty for several centuries.

=== Late Bronze Age ===
Following the decline of the Sealand Dynasty, Ur came under the control of the Kassites in the 16th century BC. Archaeological evidence from this period is sparse and predominately come from religious buildings. Material culture from this era is sparse, but a few inscriptions reveal that a handful of re-building projects were completed during this period. Most of the re-building activity occurred during the reign of Kurigalzu I. Ur does not appear to have been a significant city in Kassite period Babylonia. The city was sporadically under the control of the Middle Assyrian Empire between the 14th and 11th centuries BC.

=== Iron Age ===
The city, along with the rest of southern Mesopotamia and much of the Near East, Asia Minor, North Africa and southern Caucasus, fell to the north Mesopotamian Neo-Assyrian Empire from the 10th to late 7th centuries BC. From the end of the 7th century BC Ur was ruled by the so-called Chaldean Dynasty of Babylon. In the 6th century BC there was new construction in Ur under the rule of Nebuchadnezzar II of Babylon. The last Babylonian king, Nabonidus, improved the ziggurat. However, the city started to decline from around 530 BC after Babylonia fell to the Persian Achaemenid Empire, and was no longer inhabited by the early 5th century BC. The demise of Ur was perhaps owing to drought, changing river patterns, and the silting of the outlet to the Persian Gulf.

== Identification with the Biblical Ur ==
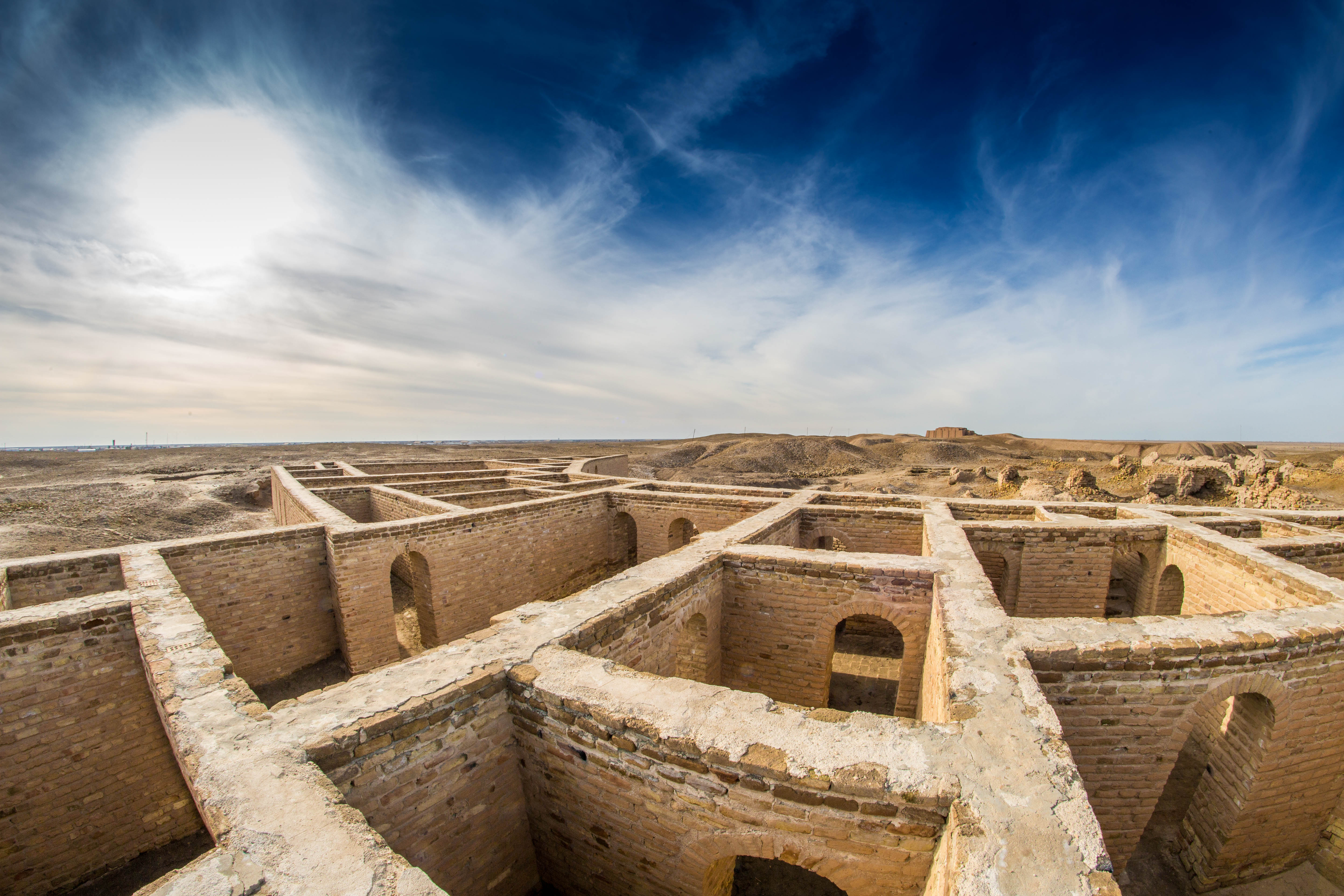
"Abraham's House" in Ur, photographed in 2016

Ur is possibly the city of Ur of the Chaldees mentioned in the Book of Genesis as the birthplace of the Jewish patriarch Abraham, traditionally believed to have lived some time in the 2nd millennium BC. There are, however, conflicting traditions and scholarly opinions identifying Ur Kasdim with the sites of Şanlıurfa, Urkesh, Urartu, or Kutha.

The biblical Ur is mentioned four times in the Torah or Hebrew Bible (Tanakh in Hebrew), with the distinction "of the Kasdim"—traditionally rendered in English as "Ur of the Chaldees". The Chaldeans had settled in the vicinity by around 850 BC, but were not extant anywhere in Mesopotamia during the 2nd millennium BC period when Abraham is traditionally held to have lived. The Chaldean dynasty did not rule Babylonia (and thus become the rulers of Ur) until the late 7th century BC, and held power only until the mid 6th century BC. The name is found in Genesis 11:28, Genesis 11:31, and Genesis 15:7. In Nehemiah 9:7, a single passage mentioning Ur is a paraphrase of Genesis.

Pope John Paul II wanted to visit the city according to the biblical tradition as part of his trip to Israel, Jordan and the Palestinian territories but the visit was cancelled due to a dispute between the Government of Saddam Hussein and representatives of the Holy See.

In March 2021, Pope Francis visited Ur during his journey through Iraq.

== Archaeology ==
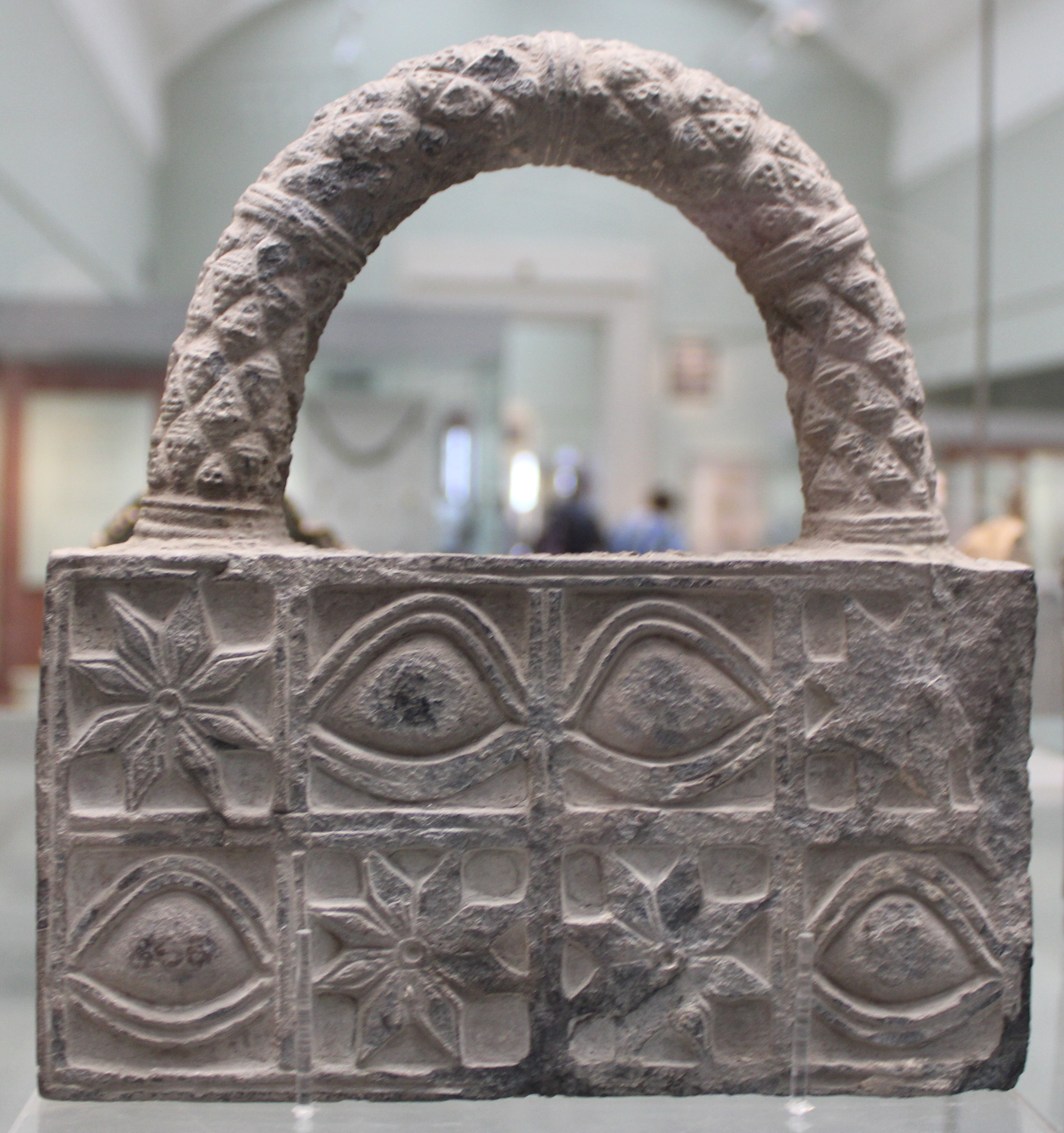
Carved stone with integral handle from Ur

In 1625, the site was visited by Pietro Della Valle, who recorded the presence of ancient bricks stamped with strange symbols, cemented together with bitumen, as well as inscribed pieces of black marble that appeared to be seals. He retrieved several inscribed bricks. It was visited in 1835 by James Baillie Fraser and John Ross who provided a detailed description. In January 1850 William Loftus and H. A. Churchill visited the site and collected brick inscriptions. European archaeologists did not identify Tell el-Muqayyar as the site of Ur until Henry Rawlinson successfully deciphered some bricks from that location, brought to England by William Loftus.

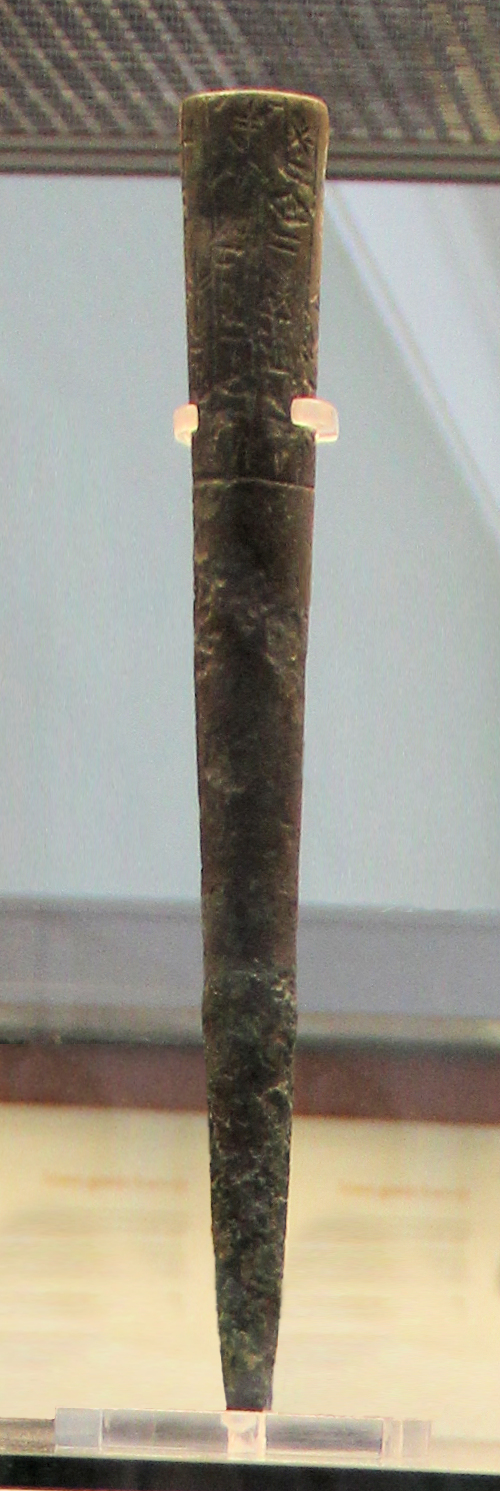
Foundation cone of A'annepada for Inanna, British Museum BM 90951

The site was first excavated, on behalf of the British Museum and with instructions from the Foreign Office, by John George Taylor, British vice consul at Basra in 1853, 1854, and again in 1858. It had long been thought that Taylor only worked at the site in 1853 and 1854 but a 48 page handwritten report of his work there in 1858 has now come to light. Finds from the dig included a carved stone with integral handle, a plaque with woman's face, and a foundation cone of A'annepada. Taylor uncovered the Ziggurat of Ur and a structure with an arch later identified as part of the "Gate of Judgment". Among the finds were copies of a standard cylinder of Nabonidus, Neo-Babylonian ruler, mentioning the prince regent Belshar-uzur, usually thought to be the Belshazzar of the Book of Daniel in the Hebrew Bible. Between 1854 and 1918 locals excavated over two hundred tablets from the site, mostly from the temple Ê-nun-maḫ, of the moon god Sin. Built by the Ur III ruler Ur-Nammu, the ziggurat was later repaired by Isin ruler Ishme-Dagan early in the 2nd millennium BC. Stamped bricks on the ziggurat detail the rebuilding of the temple of Ningal by 14th century BC Kassite ruler Kurigalzu I.

Some cuneiform tablets were found. Thirty four of these tablets were inadvertently mixed in with those excavated at Kutalla. Only in recent years has this error been recognized. Typical of the era, his excavations destroyed information and exposed the tell. Natives used the now loosened, 4,000-year-old bricks and tile for construction for the next 75 years, while the site lay unexplored, the British Museum having decided to prioritize archaeology in Assyria.

The site was considered rich in remains, and relatively easy to explore. After some soundings were made during a week in 1918 by Reginald Campbell Thompson, H. R. Hall worked the site for one season (using 70 Turkish prisoners of war) for the British Museum in 1919, laying the groundwork for more extensive efforts to follow. Some cuneiform tablets from the Isin-Larsa period were found, including omen and medical texts. They are now in the British Museum.

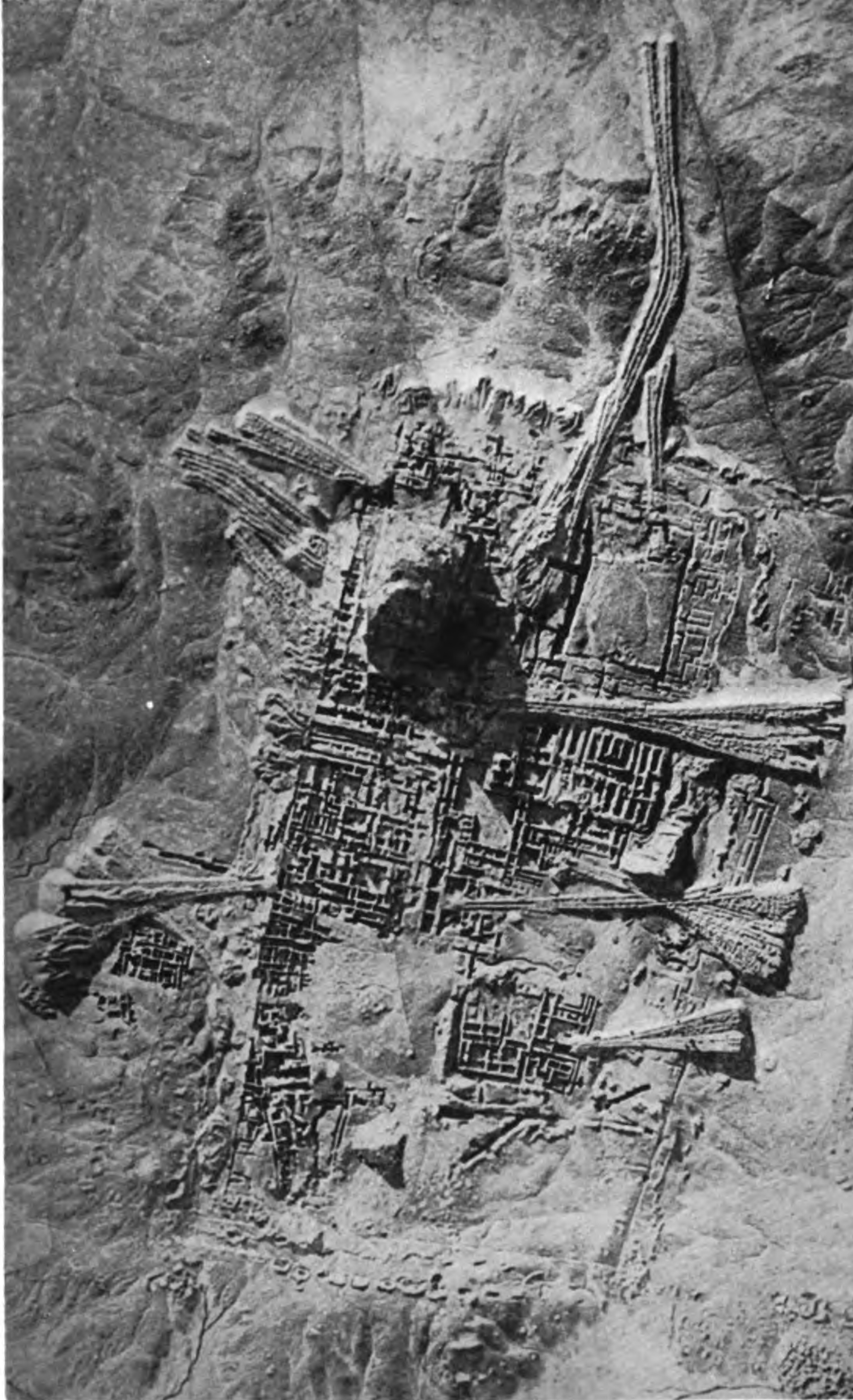
Aerial photograph of Ur in 1927

Excavations from 1922 to 1934 were funded by the British Museum and the University of Pennsylvania and led by the archaeologist Sir Charles Leonard Woolley. The last two seasons focused on closing the site properly. A total of about 1,850 burials were uncovered, including 16 that were described as "royal tombs" containing many valuable artifacts, including the Standard of Ur. Most of the royal tombs were dated to about 2600 BC. The finds included the unlooted tomb of a queen thought to be Queen Puabi (formerly transcribed as Shub-ab), known from a cylinder seal found in the tomb, although there were two other different and unnamed seals found in the tomb. Many other people had been buried with her, in a form of human sacrifice. Near the ziggurat were uncovered the temple E-nun-mah and buildings E-dub-lal-mah (built for a king), E-gi-par (residence of the high priestess) and E-hur-sag (a temple building).

Outside the temple area, many houses used in everyday life were found. Excavations were also made below the royal tombs layer: a 3.5-metre-thick (11 ft) layer of alluvial clay covered the remains of earlier habitation, including pottery from the Ubaid period, the first stage of settlement in southern Mesopotamia. Woolley later wrote many articles and books about the discoveries. One of Woolley's assistants on the site was the British archaeologist Max Mallowan.

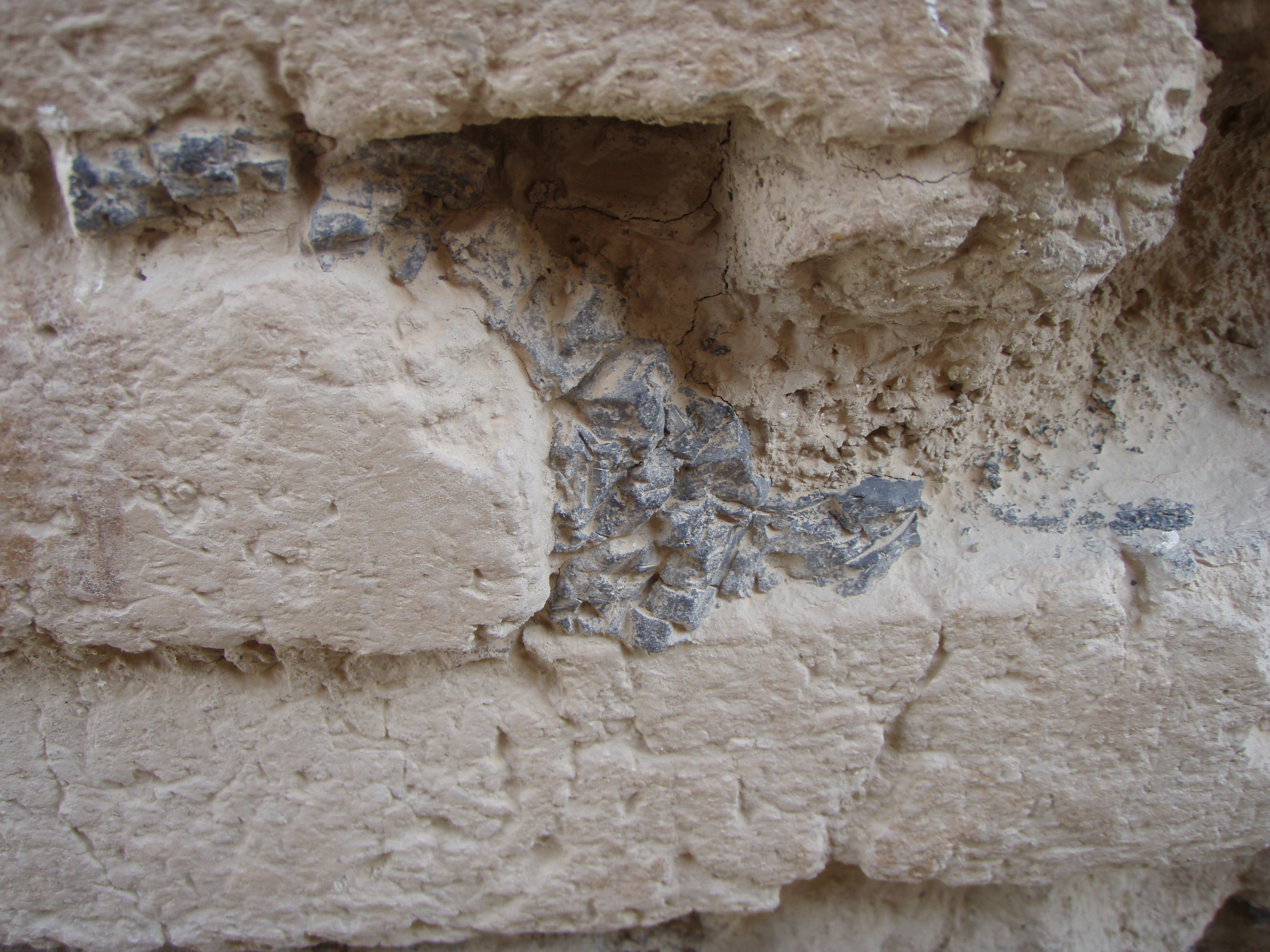
Bitumen "mortar" among Ur's mudbricks

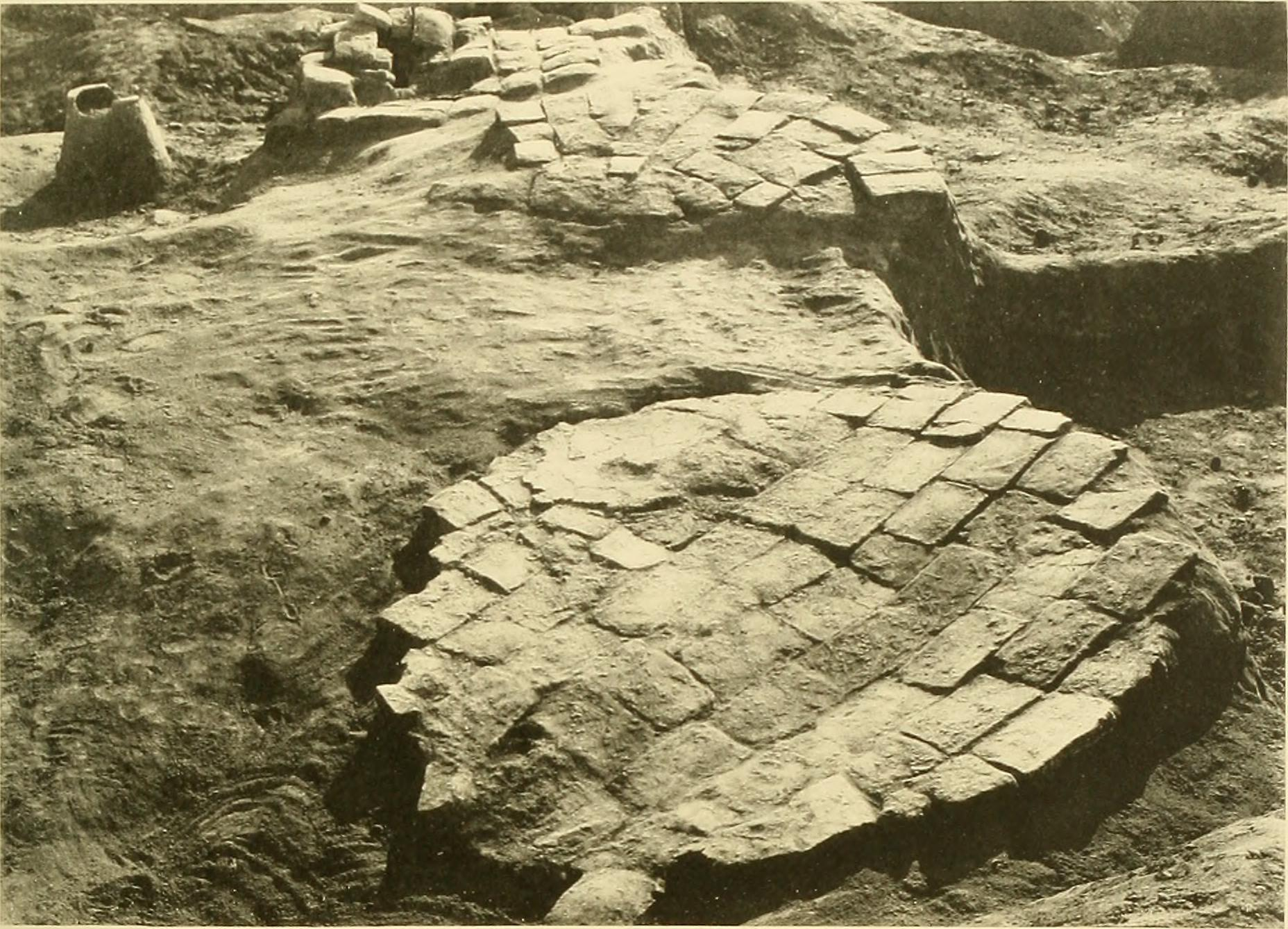
Circular groups of bricks excavated in 1900

A number of royal inscriptions were found during the Woolley excavations. Numerous cuneiform tablets were also recovered. These included archives, temple and domestic, from the Early Dynastic and Sargonic periods, the Ur III period, Old and Middle Babylonian period, and the Neo-Babylonian and Persian periods. Many literary and religious texts were also recovered.

The discoveries at the site reached the headlines in mainstream media in the world with the discoveries of the Royal Tombs. As a result, the ruins of the ancient city attracted many visitors. One of these visitors was the already famous Agatha Christie, who as a result of this visit ended up marrying Max Mallowan. During this time the site was accessible from the Baghdad–Basra railway, from a stop called "Ur Junction".

In 2009, an agreement was reached for a joint University of Pennsylvania and Iraqi team to resume archaeological work at the site of Ur. Excavations began in 2015 under the direction of Elizabeth C Stone and Paul Zimansky of the State University of New York. In part of the section they planned to work (designated AH) they found that a large area had been leveled to build a modern reconstruction of the fictional "House of Abraham" and another area had been paved over for a Papal visit. The first excavation season was primarily to re-excavate Woolley's work in an Old Babylonian housing area with two new trenches for confirmation. Among the finds were a cylinder seal and balance pan weights. A number of cuneiform tablets were unearthed, a few Ur III period, a few from the Isin-Larsa period (including one from Rim-Sîn I year 24), a few Old Babylonian period, and a number of Old Akkadian period. A similar though smaller dig was made in a Neo-Babylonian housing area. In the 2017 season an urban area adjacent to Woolley's very large AH area was excavated. The burial vault of a Babylonian general Abisum was found. Abisum is known from year 36 of Hammurabi into the reign of Samsu-iluna. Thirty cuneiform tablets were found around the vault and another 12 inside the tomb itself. A 3rd excavation season was conducted in 2019 (the University of Pennsylvania excavated in 2023 though nothing has yet been published of that work). A notable find was a large cuneiform tablet dated to the 6th year of Ur III ruler Ibbi-Sin on the swap of two large residences between private individuals (Munimah and Gayagama). One home was about 240 square meters and the other 423 square meters which is especially large for a home in that time.

Some distance south of Area AH in 2017 and 2019 a German team of Ludwig-Maximilians-Universität München directed by Adelheid Otto excavated a large home of Sîn-nādā (mid 19th century BC) chief administrator of the Temple of Ningal in the Isin-Larsa period. In levels below the final occupation were found tablets dating to Sin-Eribam and Silli-Adad, rulers of Larsa. They included a new copy of the Lament for Sumer and Ur.

=== The Royal Tomb Excavation ===
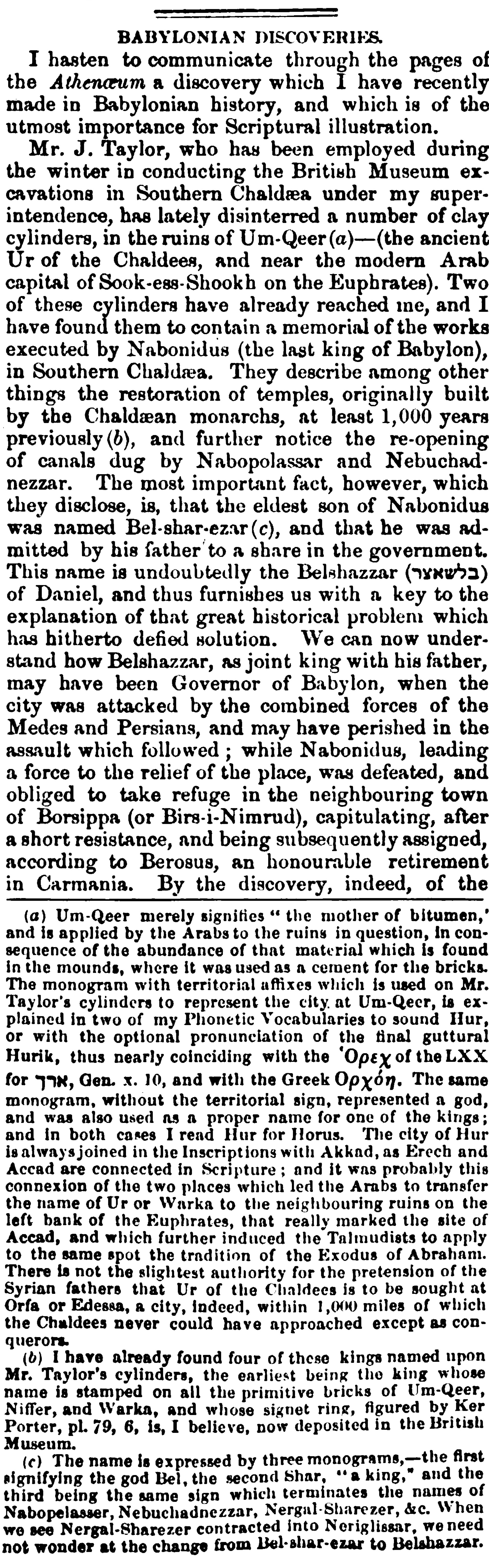
Rawlinson's March 1854 letter to The Athenaeum announcing his reading of the Nabonidus cylinders which connected Muqeyer or "Um Qeer" with the name Ur

When the Royal Tombs at Ur were discovered, their size was unknown. Excavators started digging two trenches in the middle of the desert to see if they could find anything that would allow them to keep digging. They split into two teams – A and team B. Both teams spent the first few months digging a trench and found evidence of burial grounds by collecting small pieces of golden jewelry and pottery. This was called the "gold trench". After the first season of digging finished, Woolley returned to England. In Autumn, Woolley returned and started the second season. By the end of the second season, he had uncovered a courtyard surrounded by many rooms. In their third season of digging archaeologists had uncovered their biggest find yet, a building that was believed to have been constructed by order of the king, and a second building thought to be where the high priestess lived. As the fourth and fifth season came to a close, they had discovered so many items that most of their time was now spent recording the objects they found instead of actually digging objects. Items included gold jewelry, clay pots and stones. One of the most significant objects was the Standard of Ur. By the end of their sixth season they had excavated 1850 burial sites and deemed 17 of them to be "Royal Tombs". Some clay sealings and cuneiform tablet fragment were found in an underlying layer.

Woolley finished his work excavating the Royal Tombs in 1934, uncovering a series of burials. Many servants were killed and buried with the royals, who he believed went to their deaths willingly. Computerized tomography scans on some of the surviving skulls have shown signs that they were killed by blows to the head that could be from the spiked end of a copper axe, which showed Woolley's initial theory of mass suicide via poison to be incorrect.

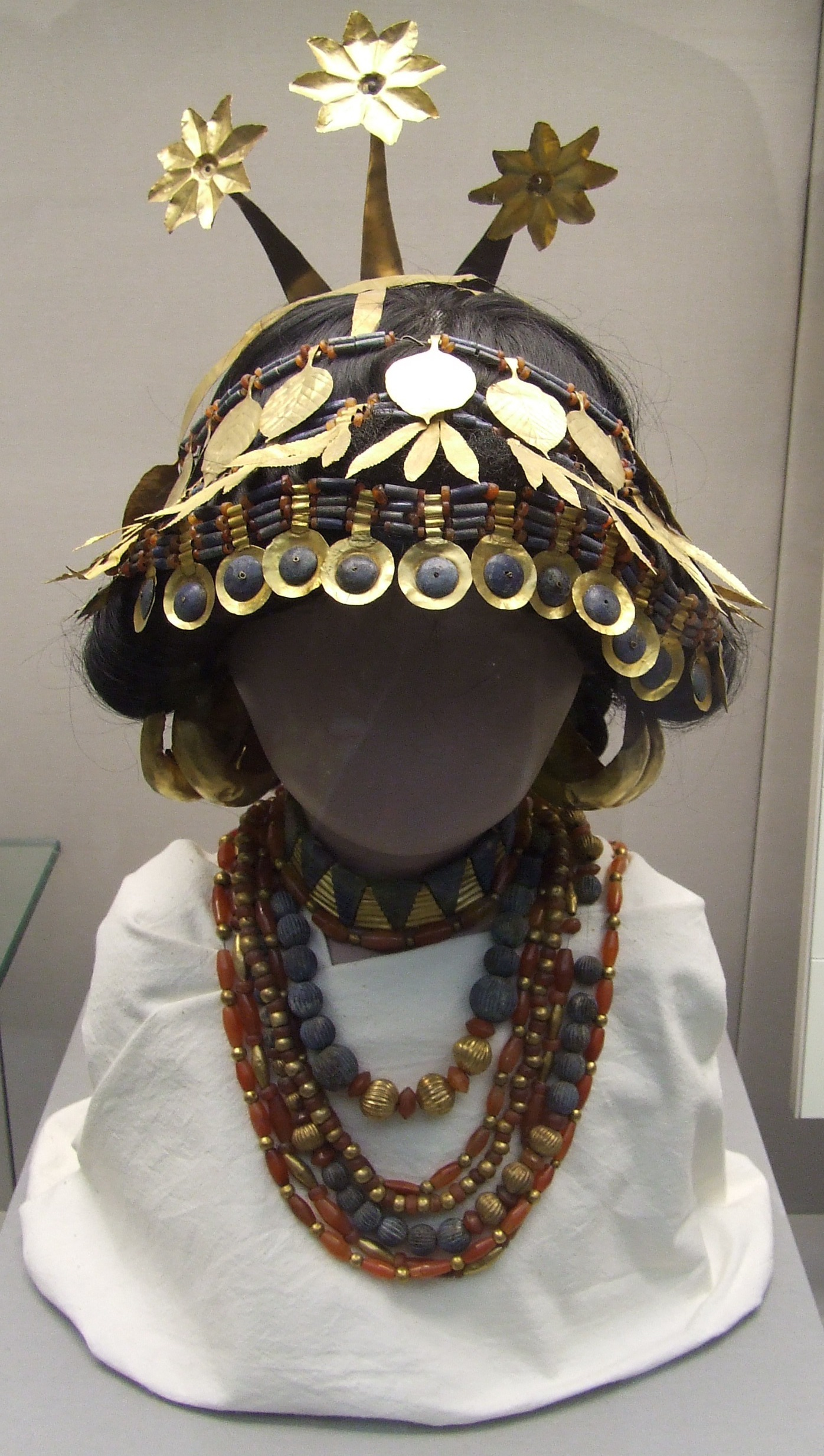
Reconstructed Sumerian headgear and necklaces found in the tomb of Puabi in the "Royal tombs" of Ur

Inside Puabi's tomb there was a chest in the middle of the room. Underneath that chest was a hole in the ground that led to what was called the "King's Grave": PG-789. It was believed to be the king's grave because it was buried next to the queen. In this grave, there were 63 attendants who were all equipped with copper helmets and swords. It is thought to be his army buried with him. Another large room was uncovered, PG-1237, called the "Great death pit". This large room had 74 bodies, 68 of which were women. This was based on artifacts found with the bodies, weapons and whetstones in the case of males and simple, non-gold, jewelry in the case of females. There is some debate about the gender of one body. Two large ram statues were found in PG-1237 which are believed to be the remains of lyres. Several lyres were found just outside the entrance. The bodies were found to have perimortem blunt force injuries which caused their death. They also had skeleton markers for long term manual labor.

Most of the treasures excavated at Ur are in the British Museum, the University of Pennsylvania Museum of Archaeology and Anthropology and the Baghdad Museum. At the Penn Museum the exhibition "Iraq's Ancient Past", which includes many of the most famous pieces from the Royal Tombs, opened to visitors in late Spring 2011. Previously, the Penn Museum had sent many of its best pieces from Ur on tour in an exhibition called "Treasures From the Royal Tombs of Ur." It traveled to eight American museums, including those in Cleveland, Washington and Dallas, ending the tour at the Detroit Institute of Art in May 2011.

Samples from two stratigraphic layers in the royal cemetery area, from before the royal burials, have been radiocarbon dated. The ED Ia layer dated to c. 2900 BC and the ED Ic layer to c. 2679 BC.

== Current status and preservation ==
Though some of the areas that were cleared during modern excavations have sanded over again, the Great Ziggurat is fully cleared and stands as the best-preserved and most visible landmark at the site. The famous Royal tombs, also called the Neo-Sumerian Mausolea, located about 250 metres (820 ft) south-east of the Great Ziggurat in the corner of the wall that surrounds the city, are nearly totally cleared. Parts of the tomb area appear to be in need of structural consolidation or stabilization.

There are cuneiform (Sumerian writing) on many walls, some entirely covered in script stamped into the mud-bricks. The text is sometimes difficult to read, but it covers most surfaces. Modern graffiti has also found its way to the graves, usually in the form of names made with coloured pens (sometimes they are carved).

The Great Ziggurat itself has far more graffiti, mostly lightly carved into the bricks. The graves are completely empty. A small number of the tombs are accessible. Most of them have been cordoned off. The whole site is covered with pottery debris, to the extent that it is virtually impossible to set foot anywhere without stepping on some. Some have colours and paintings on them. Some of the "mountains" of broken pottery are debris that has been removed from excavations.

Pottery debris and human remains form many of the walls of the royal tombs area. In May 2009, the United States Army returned the Ur site to the Iraqi authorities, who hope to develop it as a tourist destination.

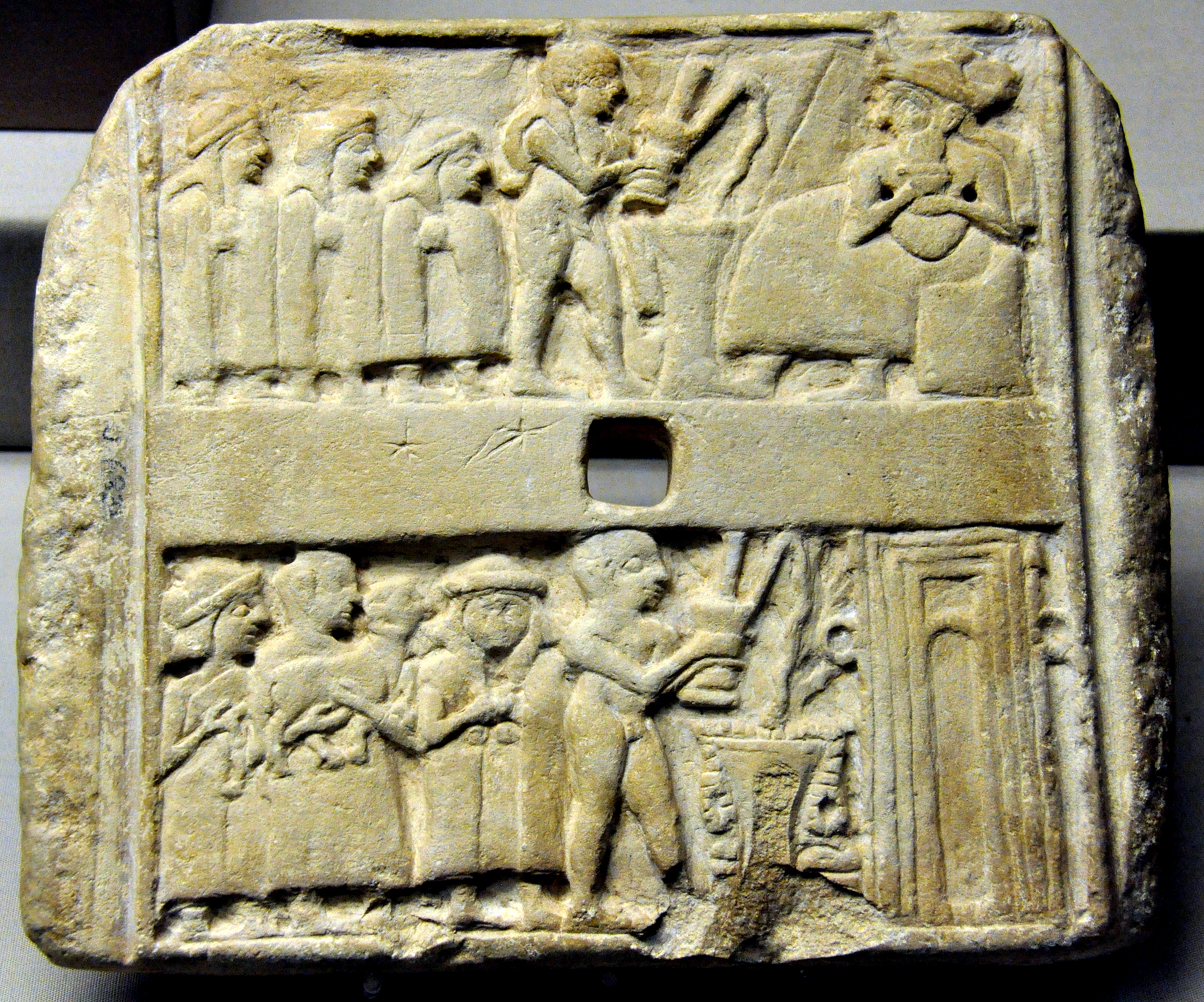
Wall plaque from Ur, c. 2500 BC; the British Museum

Since 2009, the non-profit organization Global Heritage Fund (GHF) has been working to protect and preserve Ur against the problems of erosion, neglect, inappropriate restoration, war and conflict. GHF's stated goal for the project is to create an informed and scientifically grounded Master Plan to guide the long-term conservation and management of the site, and to serve as a model for the stewardship of other sites.

Since 2013, the institution for Development Cooperation of the Italian Ministry of Foreign Affairs DGCS and the SBAH, the State Board of Antiquities and Heritage of the Iraqi Ministry of Tourism and Antiquities, have started a cooperation project for "The Conservation and Maintenance of Archaeological site of UR". In the framework of this cooperation agreement, the executive plan, with detailed drawings, is in progress for the maintenance of the Dublamah Temple (design concluded, works starting), the Royal Tombs—Mausolea 3rd Dynasty (in progress)—and the Ziqqurat (in progress). The first updated survey in 2013 has produced a new aerial map derived by the flight of a UAV (unmanned aerial vehicle) operated in March 2014. This is the first high-resolution map, derived from more than 100 aerial photograms, with an accuracy of 20 cm or less. A preview of the ortho-photomap of Archaeological Site of Ur is available online.

== Tell Sakhariya ==
The site (30º 58' 33.84" N by 46º 08' 28.36" E) was first noted, as Tell Abu Ba’arura Shimal ("Father of Sheep Droppings, North"), as a Kassite period occupation (300 NE X 150 X 2.5. Cassite: 3.5 ha) during an archaeological survey of the region in the 1960s. The site, which lies 6.45 kilometers northeast of Ur, was excavated in a five week season from December 2011 to January 2012 by a joint Iraqi State Board of Antiquities and Heritage and the State University of New York at Stony Brook team led by Elizabeth Stone and Paul Zimansky. It was measured at about 250 meters by 200 meters with two high points, about 3.5 meters above the plain, separated by a saddle. Seven trenches were dug, some small, and three yielded simple slope wash. On the surface were found Kassite and Old Babylonian period ceramics and satellite imagery suggested the presence of a large square building and a number of other walls but the excavators found no building remains in surface or magnetic gradiometry surveys, or in the later trenches. Three occupational levels were determined. The top layer contained Kassite pottery fragments, a late Kassite kiln, and a number of late Kassite burials. The second held Sealand Dynasty ceramics along with lithic (grinding stones, cuboids and one balance weight), metal, floral and faunal (primarily cattle, sheep, and goats) remains. The excavators deemed the occupations to be repeated but transient. Neither level showed signs of formal or residential architecture.

The final, earliest level also lacked notable architecture but featured a very large mud or clay platform, made from clean material, devoid of sherds, bones, or other living debris. Coring to a depth of 4 meters (1 meter below the plain) failed to find the bottom of the platform. Part of the platform is underlain by a square baked brick pavement and remains of a fish pond were found. Two 5 meter by 10 meter trenches, 55 meters apart, were excavated in this platform. An inscribed brick of the first Ur III ruler Ur-Nammu (c. 2112–2094 BC) "describing the construction of a barag – a pedestal or podium and a garden" was found out of context. Also found were four fragmentary inscribed bricks (surface finds), three inscribed cones (one datable to Larsa ruler Rim-Sîn I (c. 1822–1763 BC) year 15), and two Sumerian language cuneiform tablets. One tablet was from the early Kassite period and the other tablet was a receipt for copper utensils is dated to year 28 of Ur III ruler Shulgi (c. 2094–2046 BC). After this excavation season a nearby prison was expanded by the Iraqi government blocking access to the site and precluding further campaigns. It has been proposed as the site of Ur III Ga’eš. The ziggurat at Ur can be seen from the summit of the site.

=== Ga’eš ===
Based on the archaeology the site of Tell Sakhariya has been proposed as the Ur III period city of Ga’eš (ga-eš^{ki} and ga-eš_{5}^{ki}), site of the Akiti festival of Nanna/Sin, held every year for 11 days in the seventh month of the year and 7 days in the first month of the year. The festival began at Nanna's temple in Ur and ended in Ga’eš, possibly traveling via a canal. The temple of Nanna/Sin there was called the Karzida (kar-zi-da) was located at Ga’eš (the names Karzida and Ga’eš appear to have been used interchangeably for the city). The 36th year name of Ur III ruler Shulgi read "Year Nanna of Ga’eš was brought into his temple" and the 9th year name of Ur III ruler Amar-Sin read "Year En-Nanna-Amar-Sin-kiagra, was installed for the third time as en-priestess of Nanna of Ga’eš / of Karzida". Amar-Sin established a Giparu (nunnery) for the en-priestess of Nanna at Karzida saying "he caused En-aga-zi-ana, his beloved priestess (en), to enter there". When the en-priestess died she was buried a with "golden crown (aga), which is followed by five other golden objects". From tablets found at Ur it is known that wrestling competitions were held at Ga’eš reading "for the 'house of wrestling' in the Akiti (building), issued in Ga’eš, during the Akiti month" and "100 liters of ordinary beer, the beer for the 'house of wrestling' ... issued in Ga’eš", for example. All that is known with certainty about its location is that it lay one day's journey from Ur and was on a canal. A sketch in a 1990's paper concerning the Iturungal canal placed Ga’eš in a location corresponding to Tell Sakhariya. It has been suggested that Ga’eš was mentioned in Early Dynastic II period administrative texts. The final textual mention of was from the time of Larsa ruler Sin-Iddinam (c. 1849–1843 BC) a cone reading "Sm-i[ddinam], mighty man, [s]on [born] in Ga’eš provider of U[r], king of Lars[a], king of the land of S[umer] and Akkad] ...". Apparently Ga’eš had a gate tower based on a text from Drehem "1 fattened sheep for the great gate tower in Ga’eš" dating to the reign of Su-Sin.

One of the Temple Hymns of Enheduanna, the daughter of Sargon of Akkad (c. 2334–2279 BC), is dedicated to Ga’eš and the Karzida temple of Nanna/Sin there.

Shrine, great sanctuary?, founded at a cattle-pen, 'Small' city, ... of Suen Karzida, your interior is a ... place, your foundation is holy and clean, Shrine, your Gipar is founded in purity, Your door is (of) strong copper, set up at a great place, Cattle-pen (filled with) the lowing (of the cows), like a young bull you ... the horn, Your prince, the lord of heaven, standing in the ..., At noon (like the sun) radiating ..., O Karzida, he, Ašimbabbar, has placed the house upon your ... has taken his place on your dais. The house of Nanna in Ga’eš

Ga’eš was also mentioned in the Sumerian literary composition Lament for Sumer and Ur:

Mighty strength was set against the banks of the Id-nuna-Nanna canal. The settlements of the E-danna of Nanna, like substantial cattle-pens, were destroyed. Their refugees, like stampeding goats, were chased (?) by dogs. They destroyed Gaeš like milk poured out to dogs, and shattered its finely fashioned statues. 'Alas, the destroyed city, my destroyed house,' Its sacred Ĝipar of en priesthood was defiled. Its en priestess was snatched from the Ĝipar and carried off to enemy territory. A lament was raised at the dais that stretches out toward heaven. Its heavenly throne was not set up, was not fit to be crowned (?).

And in another composition:

O, sanctuary, big chamber built like ? a stall, mighty beaming city of Suen, Karzida, your interior is a powerful place, your foundation is holy and clean. O, sanctuary, your Ĝipar is established in purity, your door is copper, something (very) strong, established in the Underworld. O, cattle-pen, which rai[ses] the horns like a breeding bull, your prince, the lord of heaven standing in ... joy. ... at midday and ... O Karzida, Ašimbabbar, a house has established in your holy space and took (his) residence in your sanctuary!

== List of rulers ==
The Sumerian King List (SKL) gives a list of only thirteen rulers from three dynasties of Ur. The once supposed second dynasty of Ur may have never existed. The first dynasty of Ur may have been preceded by one other dynasty of Ur (the "Kalam dynasty") unnamed on the SKL—which had extensive influence over the area of Sumer and apparently led a union of south Mesopotamian polities. This predynastic period of Ur may include at least two rulers out of the first eight on this list (Meskalamdug and Akalamdug). The following list should not be considered complete:

#	Depiction	Ruler	Succession	Titles	Approx. dates	Notes
Early Dynastic IIIa period (c. 2600-2500 BC)
Predynastic Ur (c. 2600-2500 BC)
		A-Imdugud 𒀀𒀭𒅎𒂂		Governor of Ur	c. 2600 BC	Historicity certain; His name does not appear on the SKL; Known from an inscribed cylinder seal found in tomb PG 1236 located in the Royal Cemetery at Ur
		Ur-Pabilsag 𒌨𒀭𒉺𒉋𒊕	Possibly son of A-Imdugud	King of Ur	c. 2550 BC	temp. of Ursangpae; Known from an inscription fragment found in tomb PG 779 located in the Royal Cemetery at Ur
#	Depiction	Ruler	Succession	Titles	Approx. dates	Notes
Early Dynastic IIIb period (c. 2500-2350 BC)
Kalam dynasty (c. 2550-2500 BC)
		Akalamdug 𒀀𒌦𒄭	Possibly son of Meskalamdug	King of Ur	c. 2550 BC	temp. of Akurgal; Known from dynastic beads and tomb inscriptions found in tomb PG 1332 located in the Royal Cemetery at Ur
		Meskalamdug 𒈩𒌦𒄭	Possibly son of Akalamdug	King of Kish	c. 2550 BC	temp. of Enakalle; Known from dynastic beads and tomb inscriptions found in tomb PG 755 located in the Royal Cemetery at Ur
		Puabi 𒅤𒀜	Possibly Coregent with Meskalamdug	Queen of Ur	c. 2550 BC	Known from inscriptions found in tomb PG 800 located in the Royal Cemetery at Ur; She may have ruled in her own right as queen regnant
#	Depiction	Ruler	Succession	Titles	Approx. dates	Notes
First dynasty of Ur / Ur I dynasty (c. 2500-2340 BC)
"Then Uruk was defeated and the kingship was taken to Ur." — SKL
1		Mesannepada 𒈩𒀭𒉌𒅆𒊒𒁕	Son of Meskalamdug	King of Sumer King of Kish King of Ur	c. 2550 - c. 2525 BC	temp. of Ur-Lumma; Known from the SKL, Tummal Chronicle, and an inscribed seal found in tomb PG 1232/1237 located in the Royal Cemetery at Ur
2		Meskiagnun 𒈩𒆠𒉘𒉣	Son of Mesannepada	King of Sumer King of Ur	c. 2485 - c. 2450 BC	temp. of Epa'e; Known from the Tummal Chronicle his tomb PG 1157 located in the Royal Cemetery at Ur
3		Elulu 𒂊𒇻𒇻		King of Sumer King of Ur	c. 2445 BC	Historicity certain.; temp. of Lugalanda
4		Balulu 𒁀𒇻𒇻		King of Sumer King of Ur	c. 2445 BC	Known from the SKL; very little otherwise; Historicity uncertain
"4 kings; they ruled for 171 years. Then Ur was defeated and the kingship was taken to Awan." — SKL
		Lugal-kinishe-dudu 𒈗𒆠𒉌𒂠𒌌𒌌		King of Sumer King of Uruk and Ur King of Kish King of Uruk Governor of Uruk Lord of Uruk	c. 2400 BC	Originally from Uruk; temp. of Enannatum II
		Lugal-kisal-si 𒈗𒆦𒋛	Son of Lugal-kinishe-dudu	King of Uruk and Ur King of Kish King of Uruk King of Ur	c. 2400 BC	temp. of Enentarzi
		Enshakushanna 𒂗𒊮𒊨𒀭𒈾		Lord of Sumer and King of all the Land King of Sumer King of Uruk King of Ur	c. 2350 BC	temp. of Urukagina
Proto-Imperial period (c. 2350-2334 BC)
		A'annepada 𒀀𒀭𒉌𒅆𒊒𒁕	Son of Mesannepada	King of Ur	c. 2350 BC	temp. of Entemena; Known from dedication tablets with inscriptions found in tomb PG 580 located in the Royal Cemetery at Ur
		Lunanna 𒇽𒀭𒋀𒆠		King of Ur	Uncertain; this ruler may have r. c. 2350 – c. 2112 BC sometime during the Proto-Imperial period.	Historicity certain.; temp. of Sargon
#	Depiction	Ruler	Succession	Titles	Approx. dates	Notes
Akkadian period (c. 2334-2154 BC)
Second dynasty of Ur / Ur II dynasty (c. 2340-2112 BC)
"Then Uruk was defeated and the kingship was taken to Ur." — SKL
1		Nanni 𒈾𒀭𒉌		King of Sumer King of Ur	r. c. 2340 BC (54 or 120 years)	Known from the SKL; very little otherwise; Historicity uncertain
2		Meskiagnun II 𒈩𒆠𒉘𒉣	Son of Nanni	King of Sumer King of Ur	Uncertain (48 years)	Known from the SKL; very little otherwise; Historicity uncertain
3		Unknown		King of Sumer King of Ur	Uncertain (2 years)	Known from the SKL; very little otherwise; Historicity uncertain
"3 kings; they ruled for 578 years. Then Ur was defeated and the kingship was taken to Adab." — SKL
#	Depiction	Ruler	Succession	Titles	Approx. dates	Notes
Ur III period (c. 2154-2004 BC)
Third dynasty of Ur / Ur III dynasty (c. 2112-2004 BC)
"Then Uruk was defeated and the kingship was taken to Ur." — SKL
1		Ur-Nammu 𒌨𒀭𒇉	Possibly son of Utu-hengal	King of Sumer and Akkad King of Sumer King of Ur	c. 2112 – c. 2094 BC	
2		Shulgi 𒀭𒂄𒄀	Son of Ur-Nammu and Watartum	King of the Four Corners King of Sumer and Akkad King of Sumer King of Ur	c. 2094 – c. 2046 BC	
3		Amar-Sin 𒀭𒀫𒀭𒂗𒍪	Possibly son of Shulgi	King of the Four Corners King of Sumer and Akkad King of Sumer King of Ur	c. 2046 – c. 2037 BC	
4		Shu-Sin 𒀭𒋗𒀭𒂗𒍪	Possibly son of Amar-Sin	King of the Four Corners King of Sumer and Akkad King of Sumer King of Ur	c. 2037 – c. 2028 BC	
5		Ibbi-Sin 𒀭𒄿𒉈𒀭𒂗𒍪	Son of Shu-Sin	King of the Four Corners King of Sumer and Akkad King of Sumer King of Ur	c. 2028 – c. 2004 BC	
"5 kings; they ruled for 108 years. Then the reign of Ur was abolished. The very foundation of Sumer was torn out. The kingship was taken to Isin." — SKL

== See also ==
- Correspondence of the Kings of Ur
- List of cities of the ancient Near East
- Lyres of Ur
- Rejibah
- Ram in a Thicket
- Royal Game of Ur
- Short chronology
- Tal Abu Tbeirah
