= First Dynasty of Ur =

Royal dynasty in Mesopotamia

First Dynasty of Ur 𒉆𒈗𒋀𒀕𒆠 (Sumerian) nam-lugal urim_{2}^{KI} Ur I
- A map of the Near East detailing the approximated territorial extent of the Sumerian empire during the first dynasty of Ur Location of Ur, in Western Asia, modern Iraq. Ur (Iraq)
- Country: Sumer
- Founded: c. 2600 BC
- Founder: Mesannepada
- Final ruler: Balulu
- Historic seat: Ur
- Titles: List: King of Ur; King of Sumer; Governor of Ur; King of Kish; King of Uruk and Ur; Queen of Ur; Lord of Sumer and King of all the Land
- Connected families: Third dynasty of Ur
- Dissolution: c. 2340 BC

The First Dynasty of Ur (abbreviated Ur I) was a dynasty of rulers from the city of Ur in ancient Sumer who reigned c. 2600 – c. 2340 BC. Ur I is part of the Early Dynastic III period of ancient Mesopotamia. It was preceded by the earlier First Dynasty of Kish and the First Dynasty of Uruk.

== Rule ==
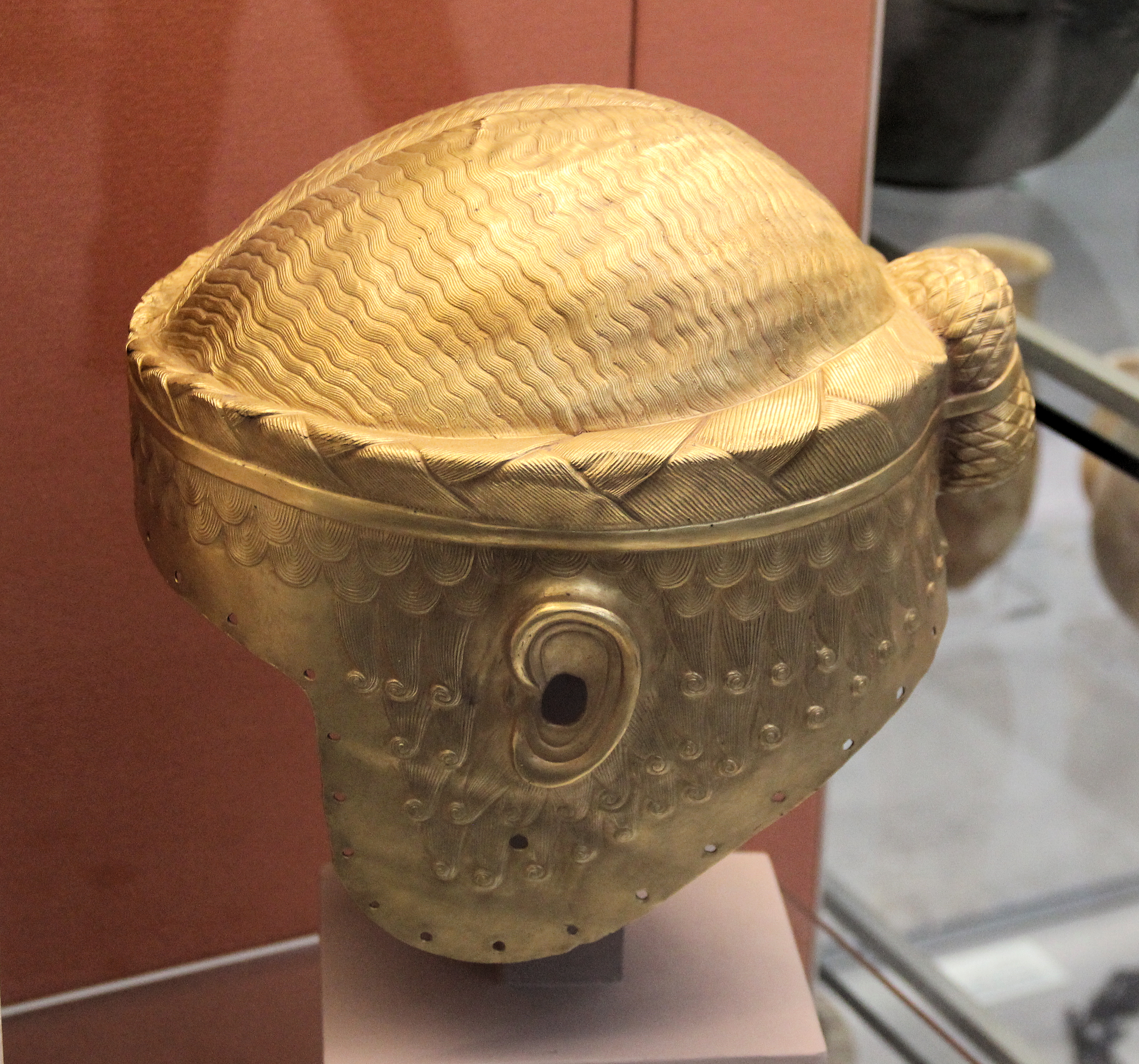
Golden helmet of Meskalamdug, possible founder of the First Dynasty of Ur.

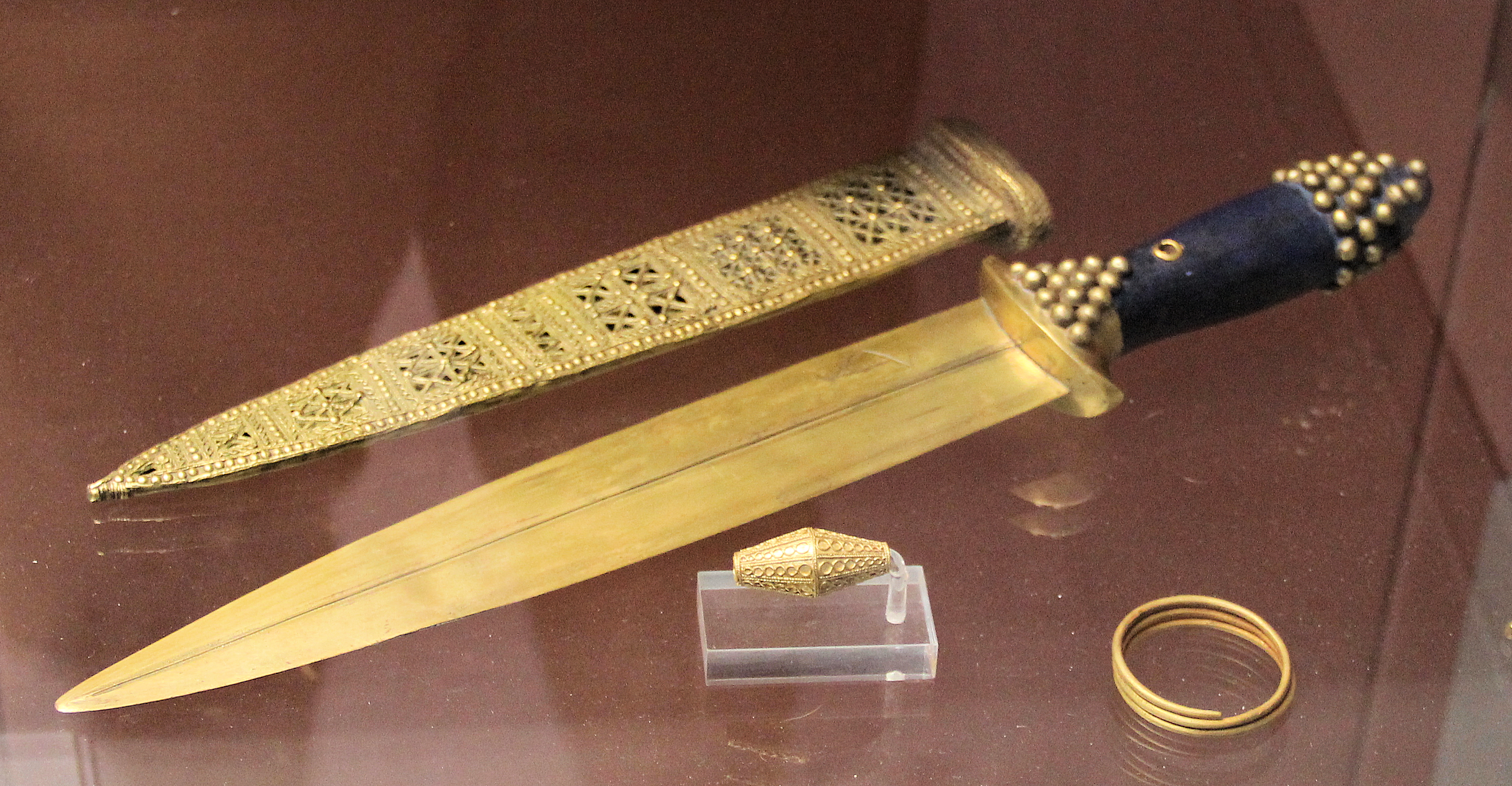
Gold objects from tomb PG 580, Royal Cemetery at Ur.

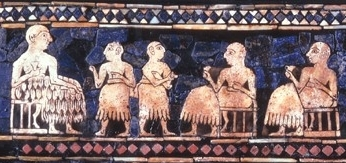
King at peace, with attendants, from the Standard of Ur.

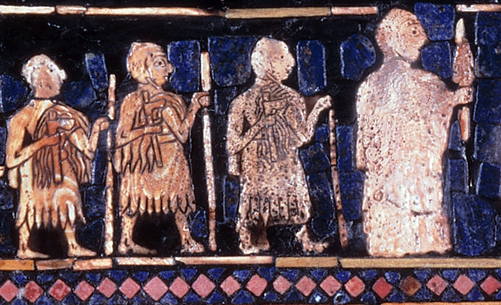
King at war, with soldiers, from the Standard of Ur.

According to the Sumerian King List, the final ruler of the First Dynasty of Uruk Lugal-kitun was overthrown by Mesannepada of Ur. There were then four kings in the First Dynasty of Ur: Mesannepada, Mes-kiagnuna, Elulu, and Balulu. Two other kings earlier than Mes-Anepada are known from other sources, namely Mes-kalam-du and A-Kalam-du. It would seem that Mes-Anepada was the son of Mes-kalam-du, according to the inscription found on a bead in Mari, and Mes-kalam-du was the founder of the dynasty. A probable Queen Puabi is also known from her lavish tomb at the Royal Cemetery at Ur. The First Dynasty of Ur had extensive influence over the area of Sumer, and apparently led a union of south Mesopotamian polities.

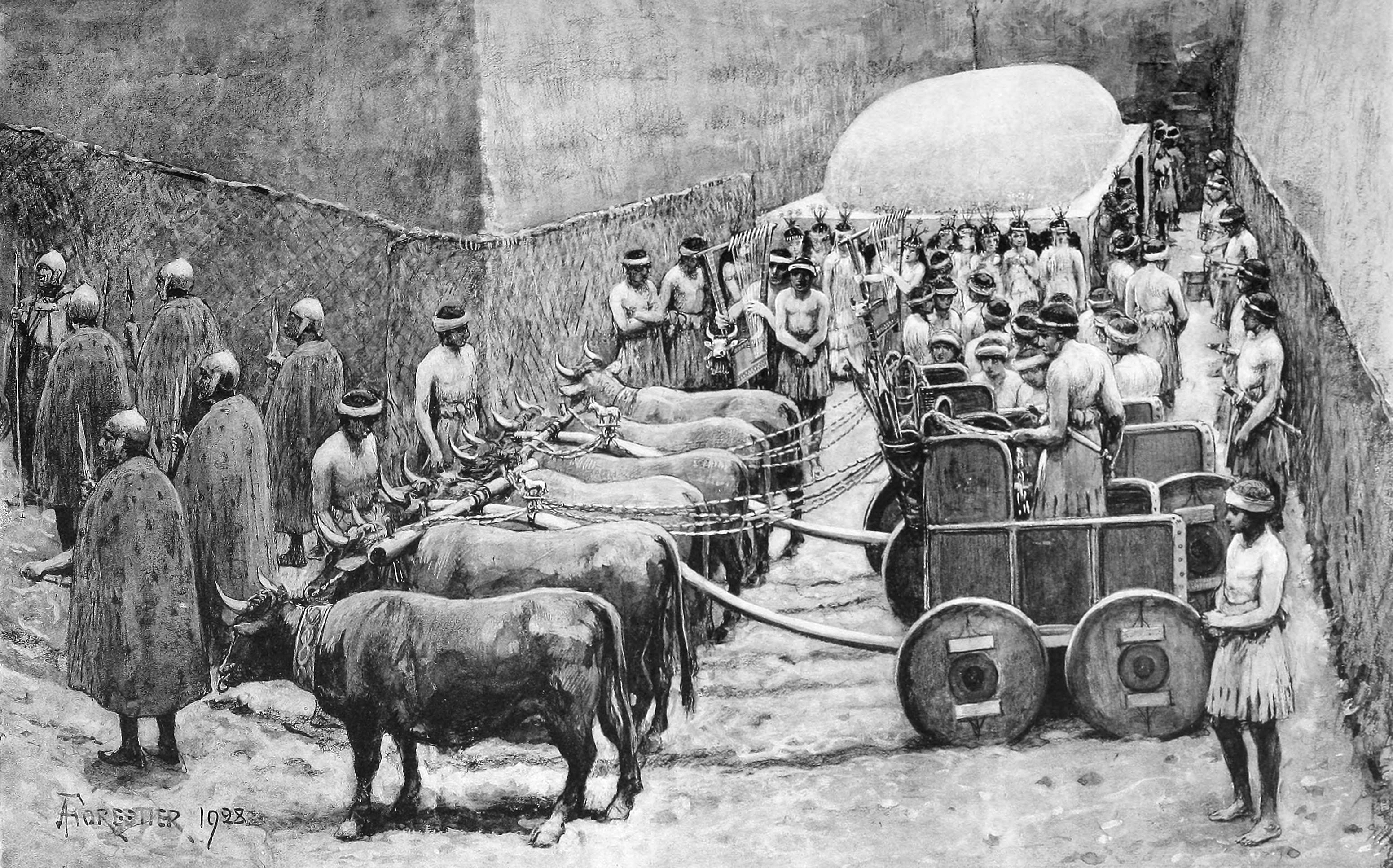
Funeral procession at the Royal Cemetery of Ur (items and positions in PG 789), circa 2600 BCE (reconstitution).

=== Ethnicity and language ===
Like other Sumerians, the people of Ur were a non-Semitic people who may have come from the east circa 3300 BCE, and spoke a language isolate.

=== International trade ===
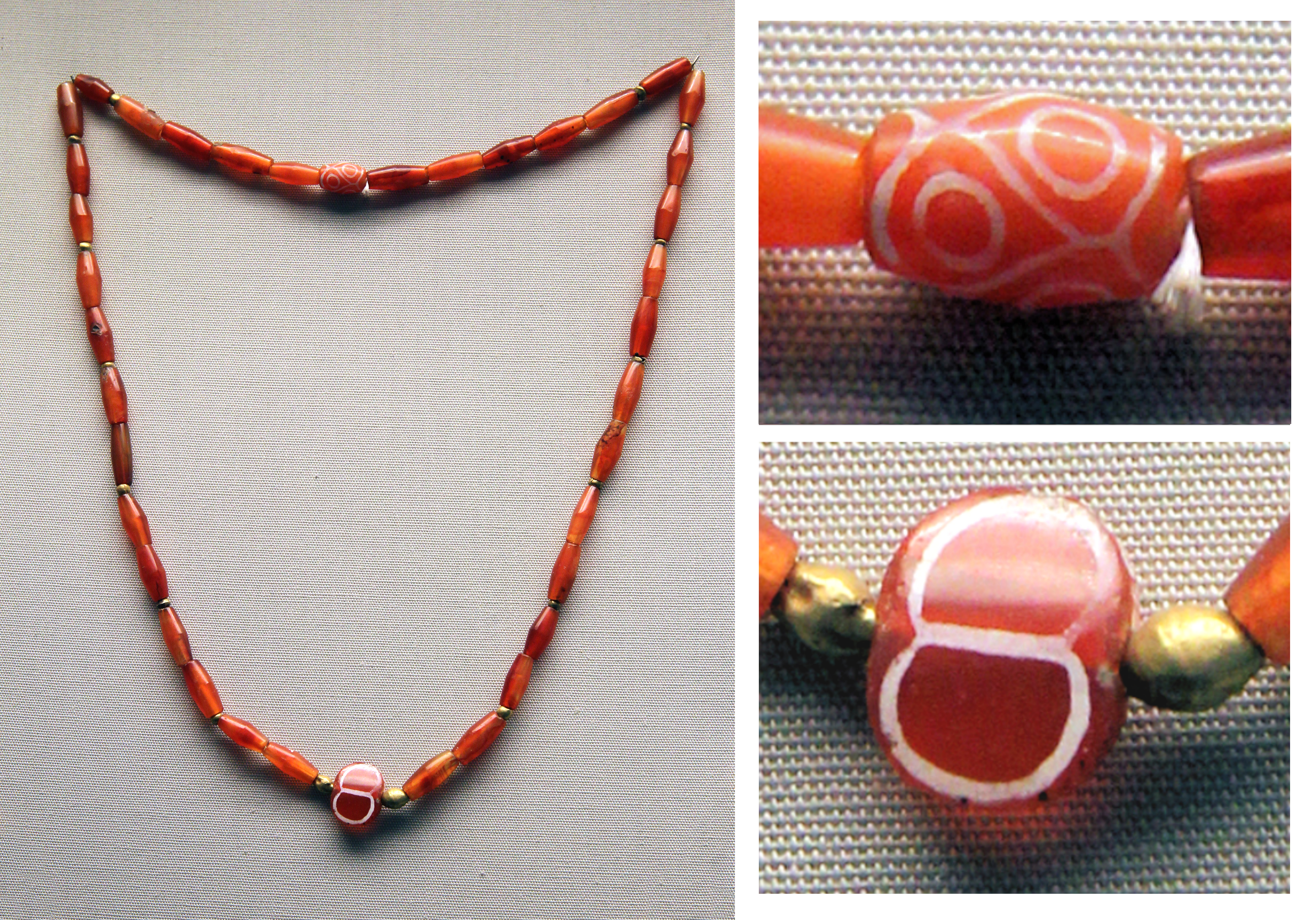
The etched carnelian beads in this necklace from the Royal Cemetery dating to the First Dynasty of Ur were probably imported from the Indus Valley. British Museum.

The artifacts found in the royal tombs of the dynasty show that foreign trade was particularly active during this period, with many materials coming from foreign lands, such as Carnelian likely coming from the Indus or Iran, Lapis Lazuli from the Badakhshan area of Afghanistan, silver from Turkey, copper from Oman, and gold from several locations such as Egypt, Nubia, Turkey or Iran. Carnelian beads from the Indus were found in Ur tombs dating to 2600-2450, in an example of Indus-Mesopotamia relations. In particular, carnelian beads with an etched design in white were probably imported from the Indus Valley, and made according to a technique developed by the Harappans. These materials were used into the manufacture of beautiful objects in the workshops of Ur.

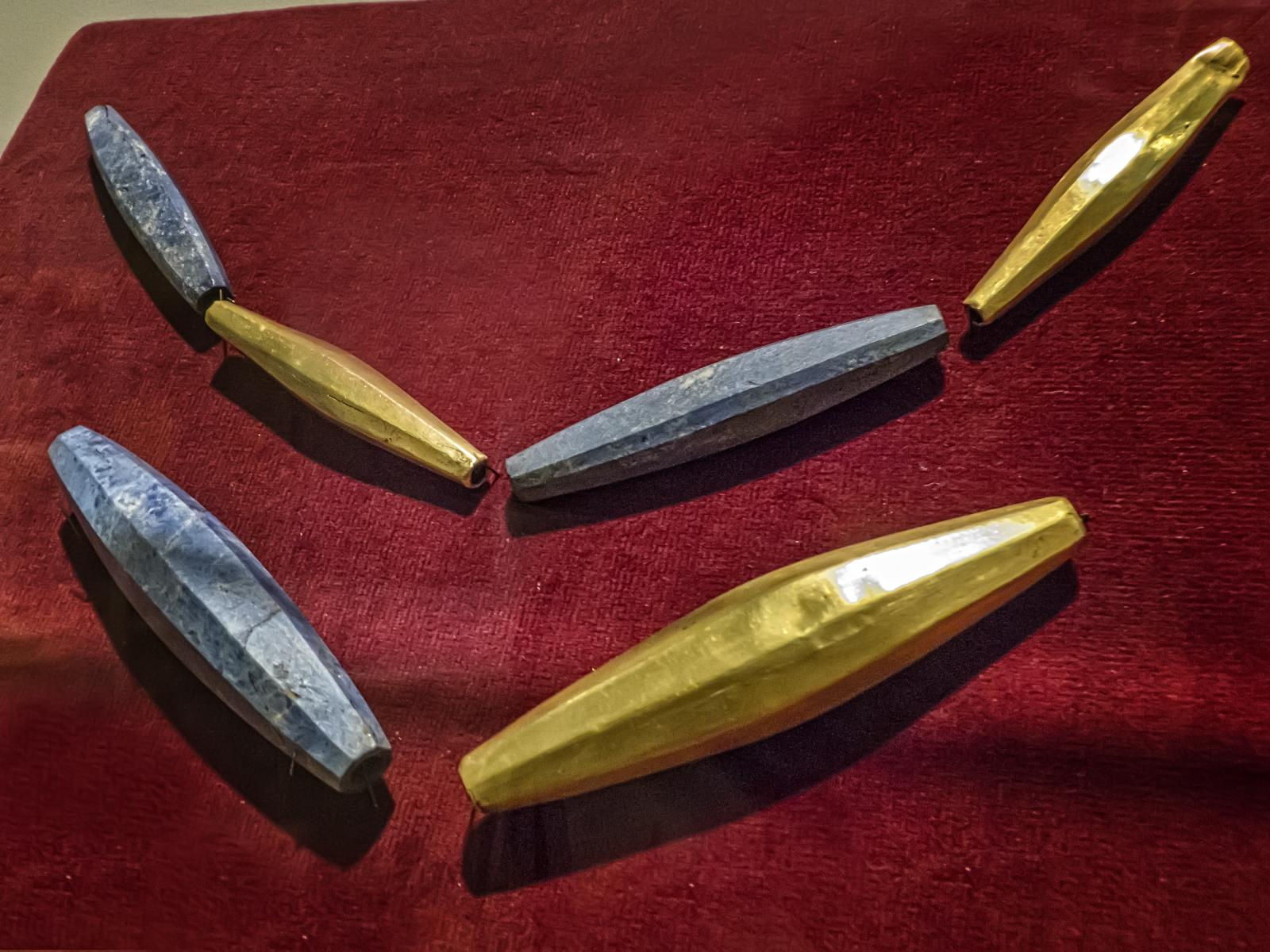
Lapis lazuli was likely imported from the Badakhshan area of Afghanistan.

The Ur I dynasty had enormous wealth as shown by the lavishness of its tombs. This was probably due to the fact that Ur acted as the main harbour for trade with India, which put her in a strategic position to import and trade vast quantities of gold, carnelian or lapis lazuli. In comparison, the burials of the kings of Kish were much less lavish. High-prowed Sumerian ships may have traveled as far as Meluhha, thought to be the Indus region, for trade.

=== Demise ===
According to the Sumerian King List, the First Dynasty of Ur was finally defeated, and power went to the Elamite Awan dynasty. The Sumerian king Eannatum (c.2500–2400 BCE) of Lagash, then came to dominate the whole region, and established one of the first verifiable empires in history.

The power of Ur would only revive a few centuries later with the Third Dynasty of Ur.

== List of rulers ==
#	Depiction	Ruler	Succession	Epithet	Approx. dates	Notes
Early Dynastic IIIa period (c. 2600 – c. 2500 BC)
Predynastic Ur (c. 2600 – c. 2500 BC)
		A-Imdugud 𒀀𒀭𒅎𒂂			fl. c. 2600 BC	Historicity certain; His name does not appear on the SKL; Known from an inscribed cylinder seal bearing the title of, "Governor of Ur" (found in tomb PG 1236 located in the Royal Cemetery at Ur)
		Ur-Pabilsag 𒌨𒀭𒉺𒉋𒊕	Son of A-Imdugud (?)		d. c. 2550 BC	temp. of Ursangpae; Known from an inscription fragment bearing the title of, "King of Ur" (found in tomb PG 779 located in the Royal Cemetery at Ur)
#	Depiction	Ruler	Succession	Epithet	Approx. dates	Notes
Early Dynastic IIIb period (c. 2500 – c. 2350 BC)
		Akalamdug 𒀀𒌦𒄭	Son of Meskalamdug (?)		reigned c. 2500 BC	Son of Meskalamdug (?); temp. of Akurgal; Known from dynastic beads and tomb inscriptions bearing the title of, "King of Ur" (found in tomb PG 1332 located in the Royal Cemetery at Ur)
		Meskalamdug 𒈩𒌦𒄭	Son of Akalamdug (?)		r. c. 2500 BC	Son of Akalamdug (?); temp. of Enakalle; Known from dynastic beads and tomb inscriptions bearing the title of, "King of Kish" (found in tomb PG 755 located in the Royal Cemetery at Ur)
		Puabi 𒅤𒀜	m. c. 2500 to Meskalamdug (?)			Known from inscriptions bearing the title of, "Queen" (found in tomb PG 800 located in the Royal Cemetery at Ur); She may have ruled in her own right as queen regnant
"Then Uruk was defeated and the kingship was taken to Ur." — SKL
1st		Mesannepada 𒈩𒀭𒉌𒅆𒊒𒁕	Son of Meskalamdug (?)		r. c. 2500 BC (80 years)	Son of Meskalamdug (?); temp. of Ur-Lumma; Known from the SKL, Tummal Chronicle, and an inscribed seal bearing the title of, "King of Kish" (found in tomb PG 1232/1237 located in the Royal Cemetery at Ur)
2nd		Meskiagnun 𒈩𒆠𒉘𒉣	Son of Mesannepada (?)		r. c. 2485 – c. 2450 BC (30 or 36 years)	Son of Mesannepada (?); temp. of Epa'e; Said on the SKL to have been the son of Mesannepada and to have held the title of, "King" of not just Ur; but, all of Sumer; Known from the Tummal Chronicle his tomb PG 1157 located in the Royal Cemetery at Ur
3rd		Elulu 𒂊𒇻𒇻			r. c. 2445 BC (25 years)	Historicity certain.; Said on the SKL to have held the title of "king" of not just Ur; but, all of Sumer.; temp. of Lugalanda
4th		Balulu 𒁀𒇻𒇻			Uncertain (36 years)	Historicity uncertain.; Known from the SKL; very little otherwise.; Said on the SKL to have held the title of "king" of not just Ur; but, all of Sumer.
"4 kings; they ruled for 171 years. Then Ur was defeated and the kingship was taken to Awan." — SKL
		Enshakushanna 𒂗𒊮𒊨𒀭𒈾	Son of Elulu (?)		r. c. 2430 BC (60 years)	Son of Elulu (?); temp. of Urukagina; Held the title of "lord of Sumer and king of all the land".
		Lugal-kinishe-dudu 𒈗𒆠𒉌𒂠𒌌𒌌			r. c. 2400 BC (120 years)	Originally from Uruk; Held the title of "King of Uruk and Ur"; temp. of Enannatum II
		Lugal-kisal-si 𒈗𒆦𒋛	Son of Lugal-kinishe-dudu		r. c. 2400 BC	Son of Lugal-kinishe-dudu.; Held the title of "king of Uruk and Ur".; temp. of Enentarzi
		A'annepada 𒀀𒀭𒉌𒅆𒊒𒁕	Son of Mesannepada		Uncertain; this ruler may have r. c. 2500 – c. 2350 BC sometime during the EDIIIb period	Son of Mesannepada; temp. of Entemena; Known from dedication tablets with inscriptions bearing the title "King of Ur" (found in tomb PG 580 located in the Royal Cemetery at Ur)
#	Depiction	Ruler	Succession	Epithet	Approx. dates	Notes
Proto-Imperial period (c. 2350 – c. 2112 BC)
		Lunanna			Uncertain; this ruler may have r. c. 2350 – c. 2112 BC sometime during the Proto-Imperial period	Historicity certain.; temp. of Sargon

=== Sumerian King List ===
Only the final kings of the First Dynasty of Ur, from Mesannepada to Balulu and possibly 4 unnamed kings, are mentioned in the Sumerian King List:

"... Uruk with weapons was struck down, the kingship to Ur was carried off. In Ur Mesannepada was king, 80 years he ruled; Mesh-ki-ang-Nanna, son of Mesannepada, was king, 36 years he ruled; Elulu, 25 years he ruled; Balulu, 36 years he ruled; 4 kings, the years: 171(?) they ruled. Ur with weapons was struck down; the kingship to Awan was carried off.

— Sumerian King List, 137-147.

== Artifacts ==
The Royal Cemetery of Ur held the tombs of several rulers of the First Dynasty of Ur. The tombs are particularly lavish, and testify to the wealth of the First Dynasty of Ur. One of the most famous tombs is that of Queen Puabi.

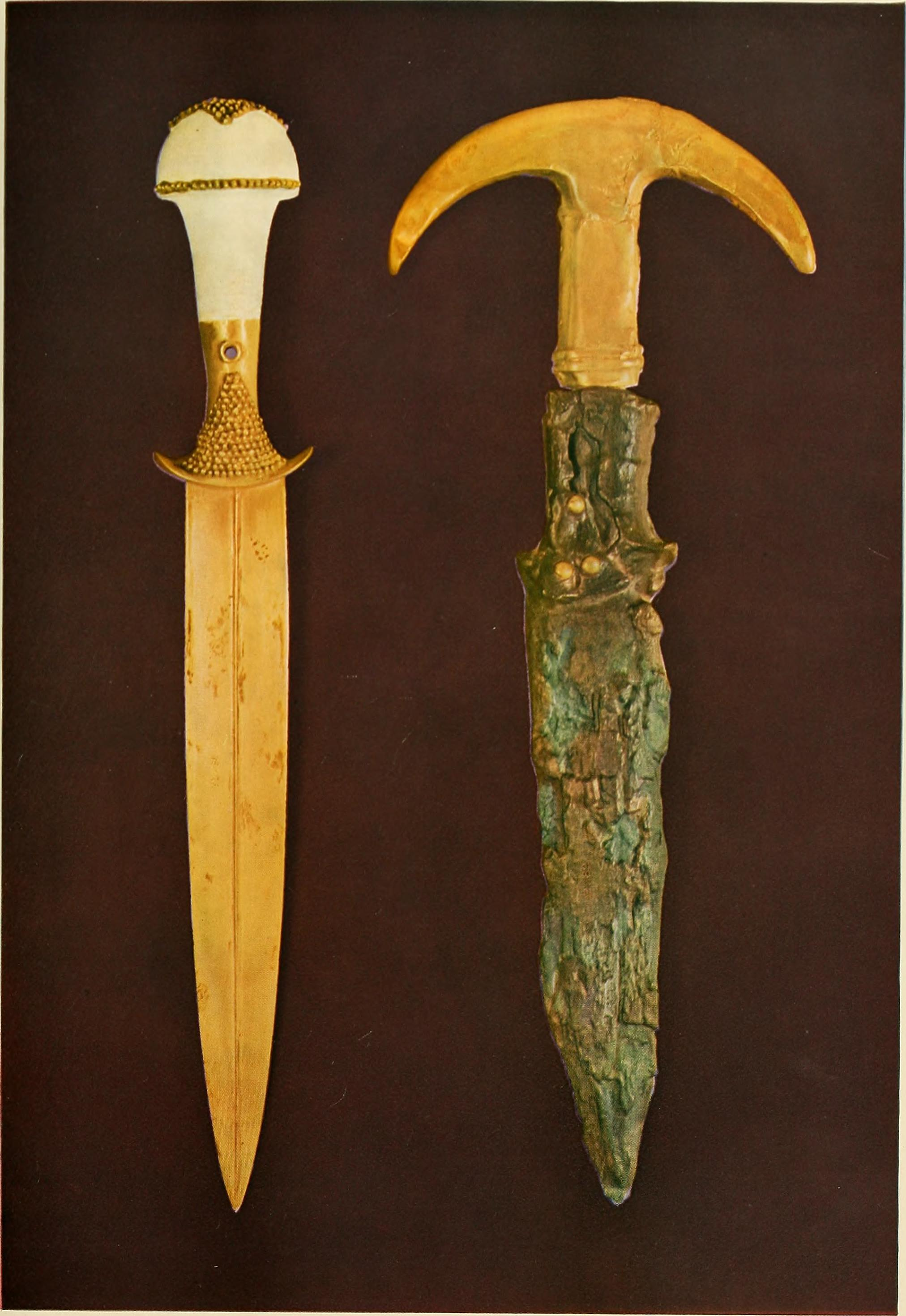
A gold dagger and a dagger with a gold-plated handle, Ur excavations (1900).

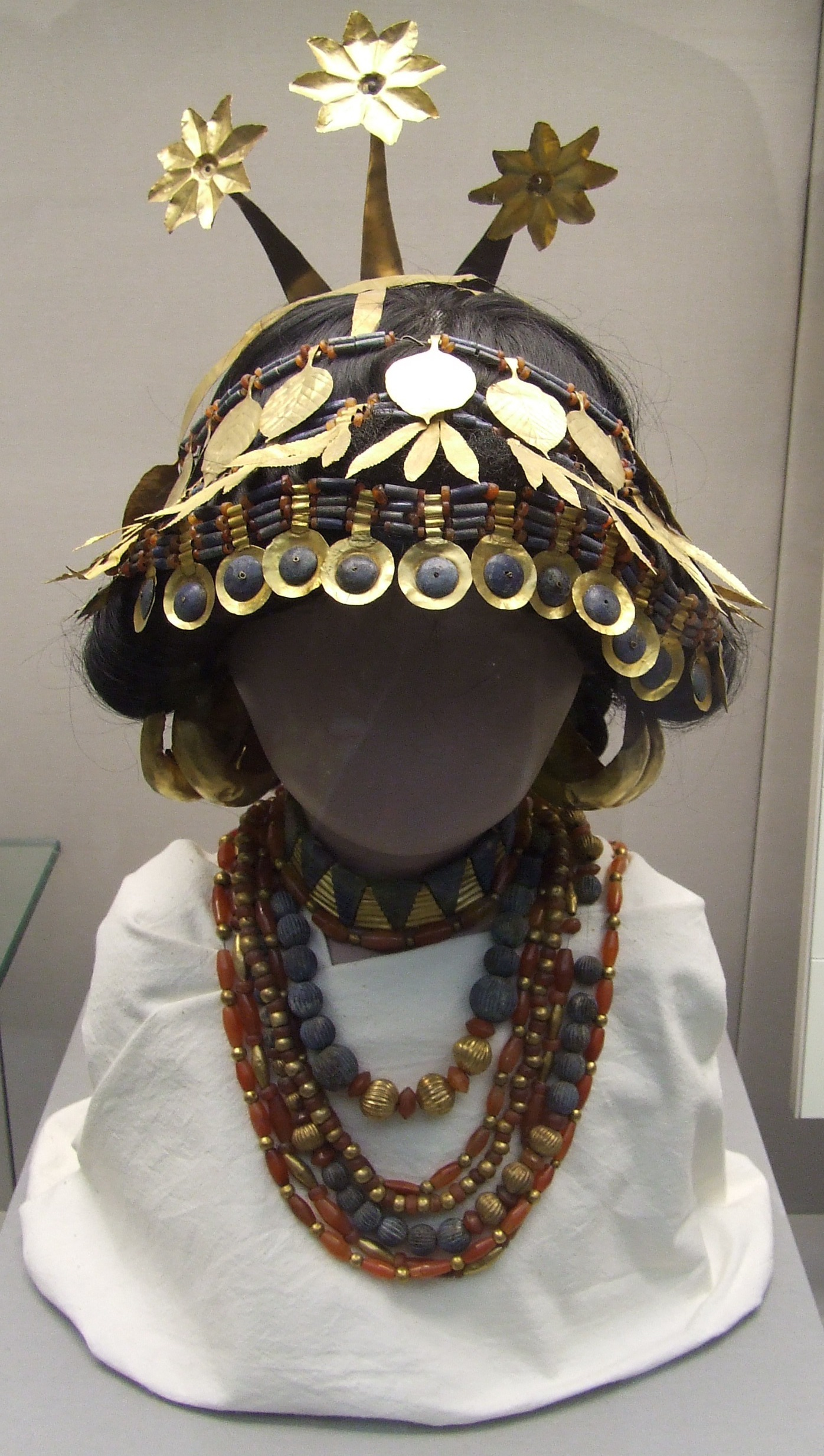
Reconstructed Sumerian headgear necklaces found in the tomb of Puabi, housed at the British Museum

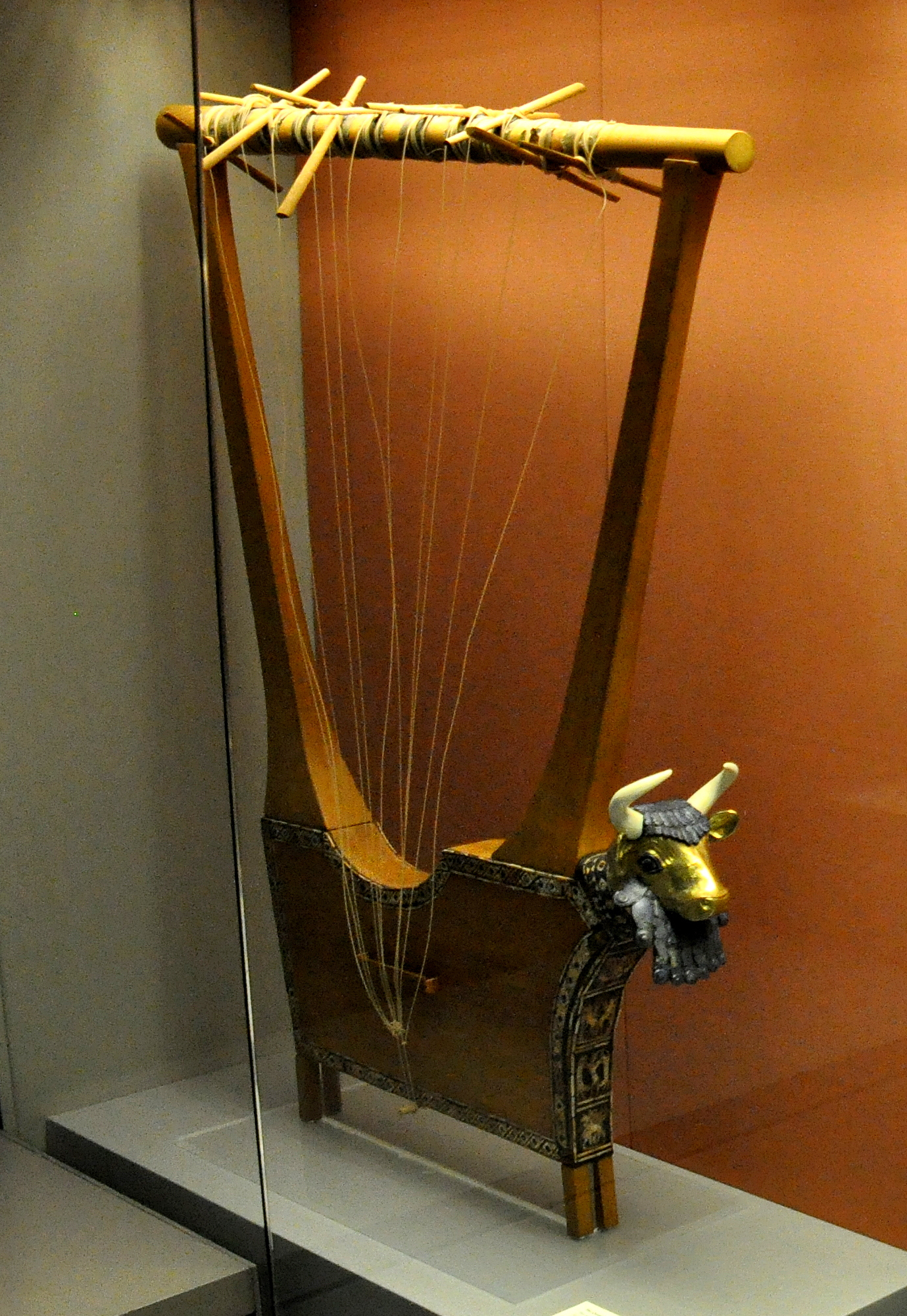
Queen's Lyre, one of the Lyres of Ur, Ur Royal Cemetery.

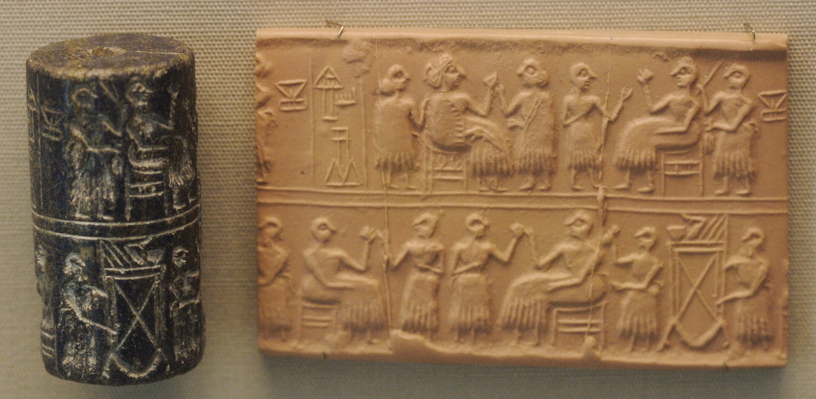
Cylinder seal of Queen Puabi, found in her tomb. Inscription 𒅤𒀀𒉿 𒊩𒌆Pu-A-Bi-Nin "Queen Puabi". The last word "𒊩𒌆" can either be pronounced Nin “lady”, or Eresh “queen”.

The Standard of Ur

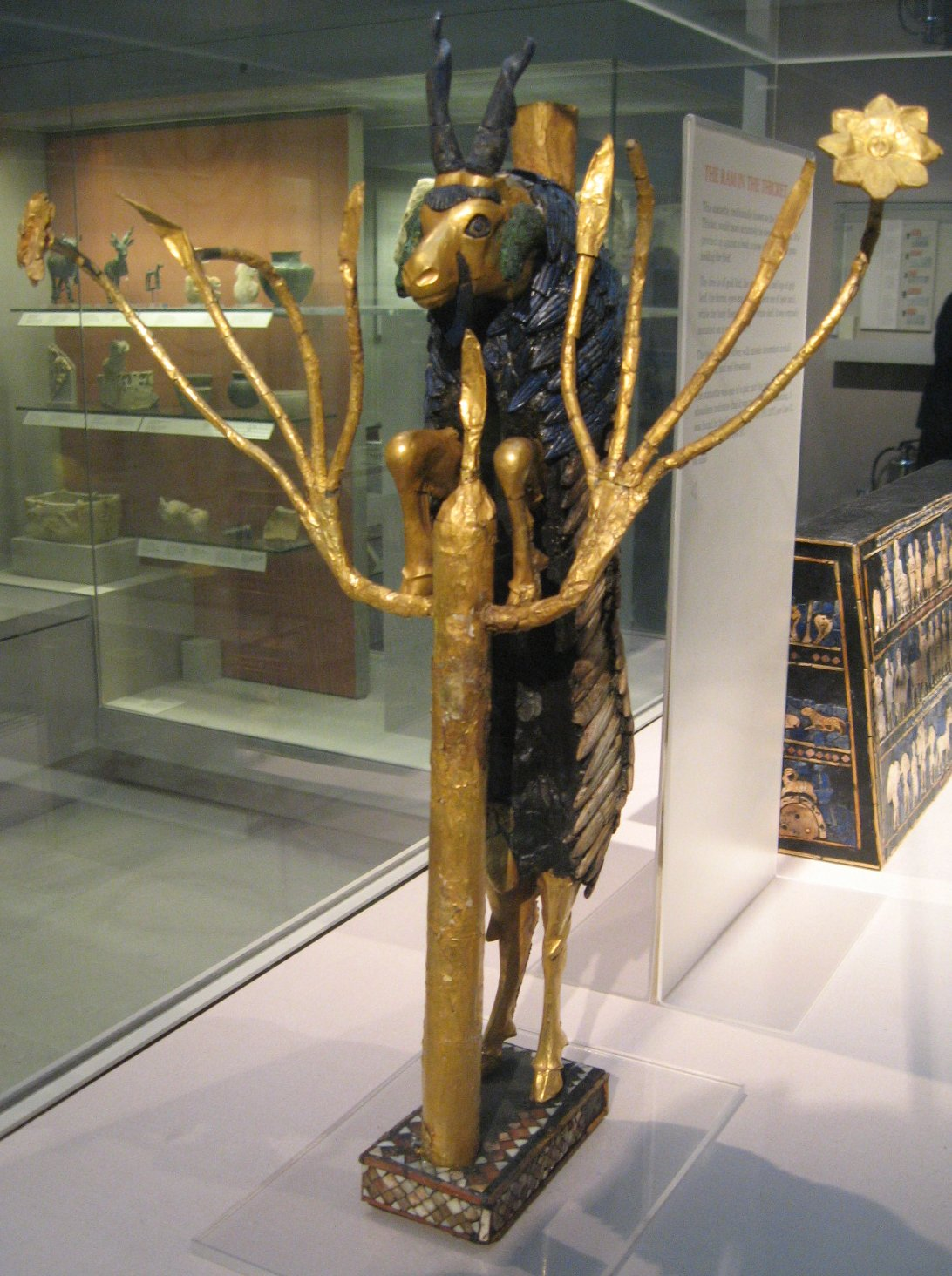
Ram in a Thicket

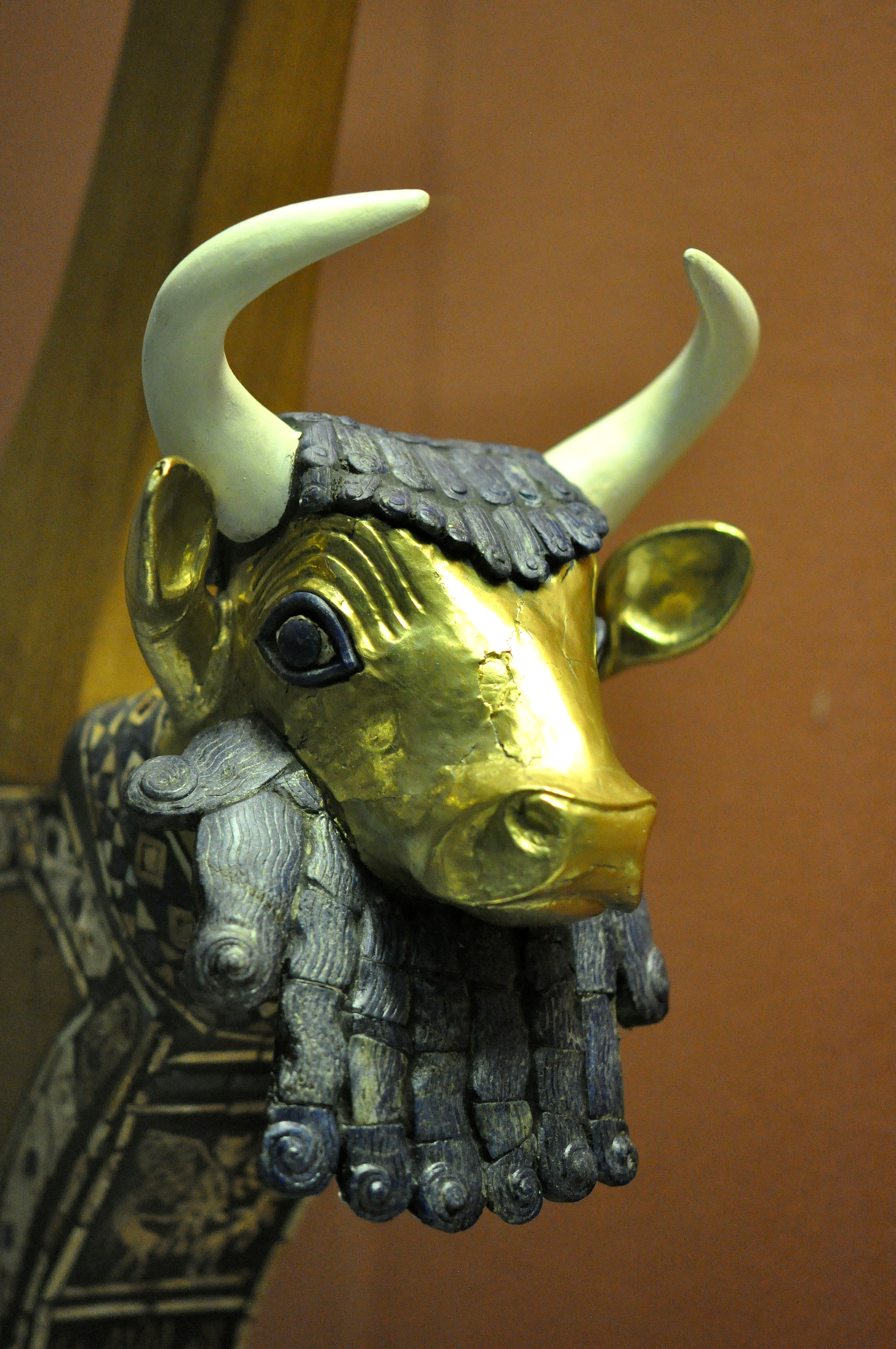
Lyre of a Bull's Head from Queen Puabi's tomb. (British Museum)

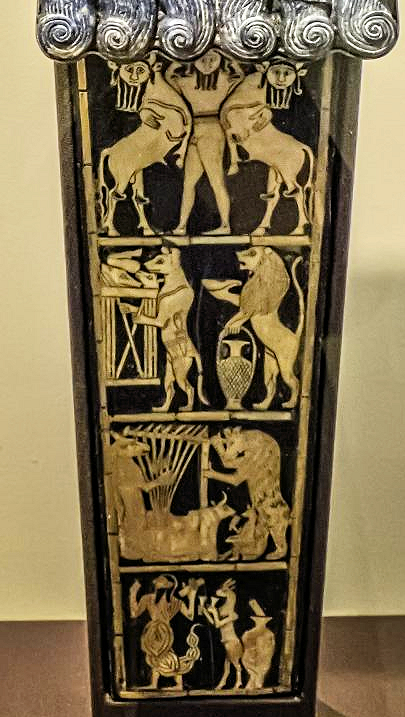
Nacre plate with anthropomorphic animals, circa 2600 BCE

== See also ==
- Sumerian King List
- History of Sumer
- Third Dynasty of Ur
