= Meskiagnun =

Meskiagnun 𒈩𒆠𒉘𒉣
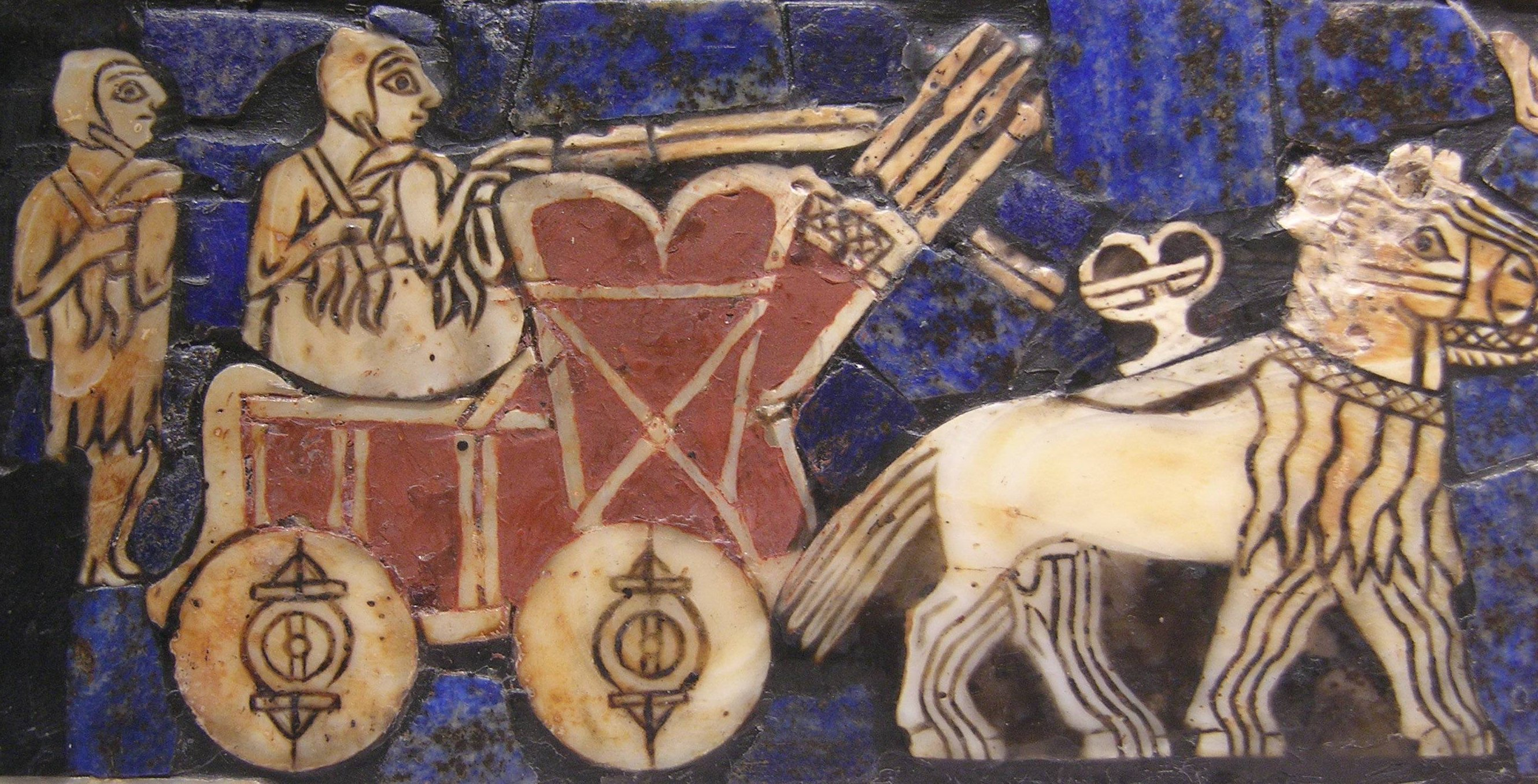
- King at war, from the Standard of Ur

King of Ur
- Reign: c. 2485 - c. 2450 BC
- Predecessor: Possibly A'annepada
- Successor: Possibly Elulu
- Died: c. 2450 BC
- Spouse: Gan-Saman
- Dynasty: First Dynasty of Ur
- Father: Mesannepada

Location of Ur

Meskiagnun, also Mesh-ki-ang-Nanna (Sumerian: 𒈩𒆠𒉘𒉣, Meskiag̃nun [mes-ki-aŋ₂-nun], also 𒀭𒈩𒆠𒉘𒉣𒈾, Meskiag̃nunna [^{D}mes-ki-aŋ₂-nun-na]; died c. 2450 BC), was the fourth lugal or king of the First Dynasty of Ur, according to the Sumerian King List, which states he ruled for 36 years.

== Bowl dedication ==
Meskiagnun is mentioned in two bowl dedications by his wife Gan-Saman, with the same inscription:

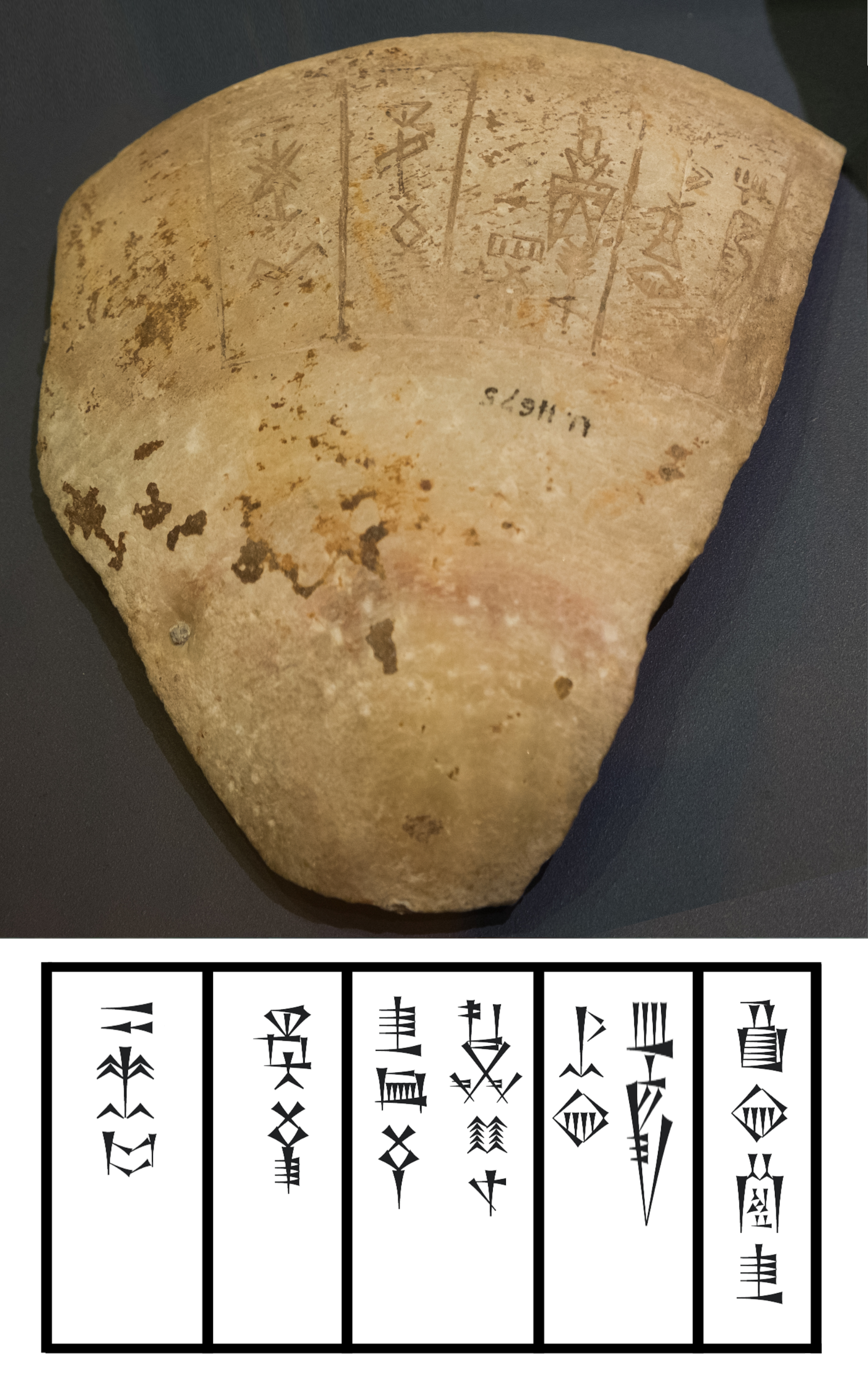
British Museum (BM 122255)

𒈩𒆠𒉘𒉣 / 𒈗𒌶𒆠 / 𒃶𒊺𒉣𒂠𒁍𒉡 / 𒁮𒋤 / 𒀀𒈬𒊒
[mes-ki]-ag2-nun / lugal uri5^{ki} / gan-saman (SZE.NUN.SZE3.BU)-nu / dam-su3 / a mu-ru

"For (the life of) Meski’agnun, king of Ur, Gan-Saman, his wife, dedicated this"

— Bowl of Gan-Saman (British Museum, BM 122255).

== Records of temple dedication to the gods in the Tummal inscription ==
He is also mentioned in the Tummal Inscription with his father Mesannepada, as restoring the Tummal shrine to Enlil and Ninlil in Nippur after it had "fallen into ruin":

"En-me-barage-si, the king, built the Iri-nanam in Enlil's temple. Aga, son of En-me-barage-si, made the Tummal flourish and brought Ninlil into the Tummal. Then the Tummal fell into ruins for the first time. Meš-Ane-pada built the Bur-šušua in Enlil's temple. Meš-ki-aĝ-nuna, son of Meš-Ane-pada, made the Tummal flourish and brought Ninlil into the Tummal."

— Old Babylonian tablet Tummal Inscription (1900-1600 BCE)

== Chronological discrepancies ==
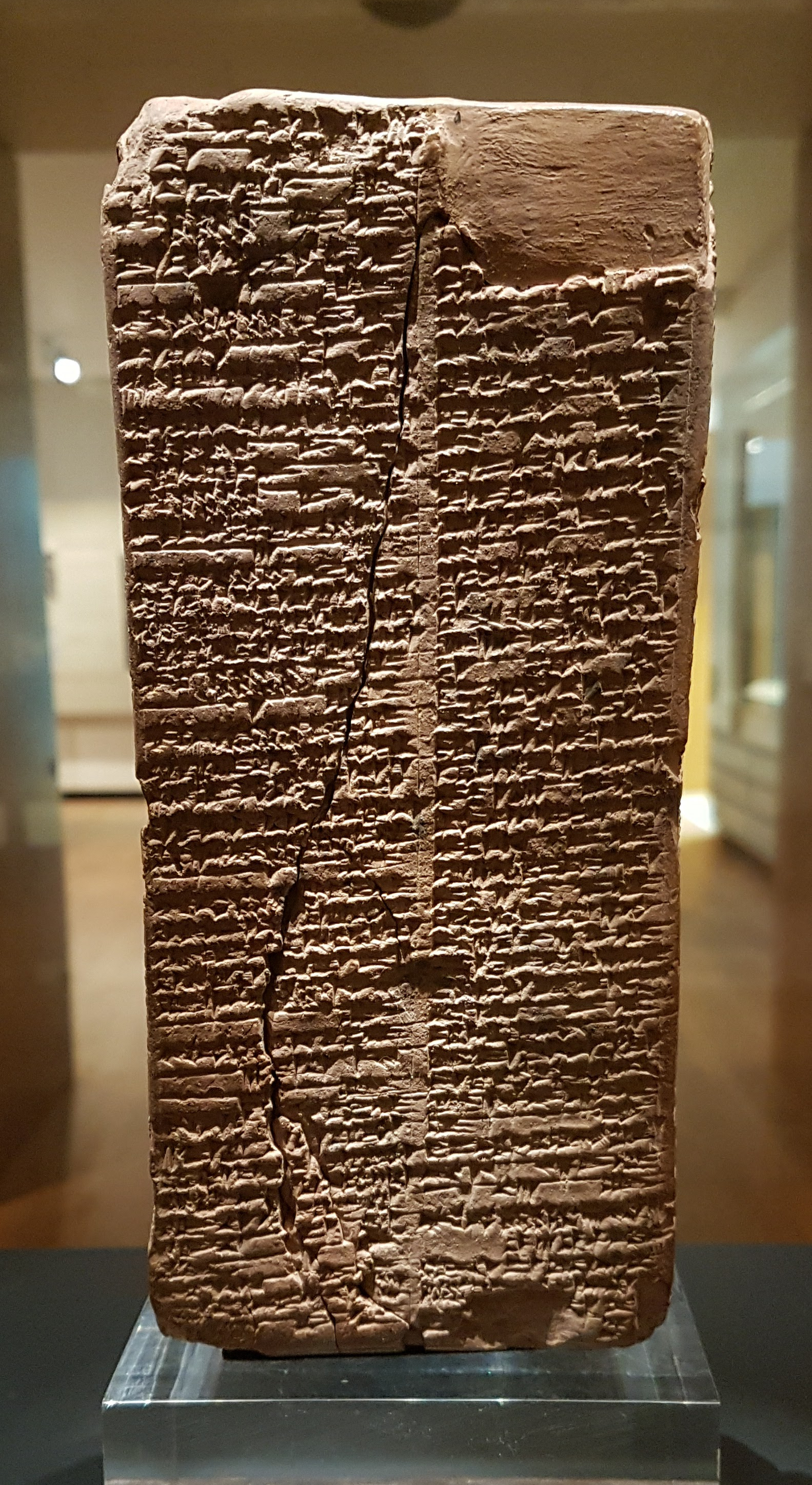
Meskiagnun appears in the Sumerian King List

The Tummal inscription attests to a relative date for Meskiagnun and his father between Enmebaragesi and Gilgamesh, whereas the Sumerian King List dates the father and son pair generations after Enmebaragesi and Gilgamesh. Samuel Noah Kramer notes that this raises "a chronological problem which cannot be resolved for the present." Meskiagnun is mentioned as follows in the Sumerian King List:

"... Uruk with weapons was struck down, the kingship to Ur was carried off. In Ur Mesannepada was king, 80 years he ruled; Meskiagnun, son of Mesannepada, was king, 36 years he ruled; Elulu, 25 years he ruled; Balulu, 36 years he ruled; 4 kings, the years: 171(?) they ruled. Ur with weapons was struck down; the kingship to Awan was carried off.

— Sumerian King List, 137-147.

Regnal titles
Preceded by Possibly A'annepada	King of Sumer	Succeeded by Possibly Elulu
Preceded by Possibly A'annepada	Ensí of Ur c. 2485 - 2450 BC	Succeeded by Possibly Elulu
