= A-Imdugud =

A-Imdugud 𒀀𒀭𒅎𒂂
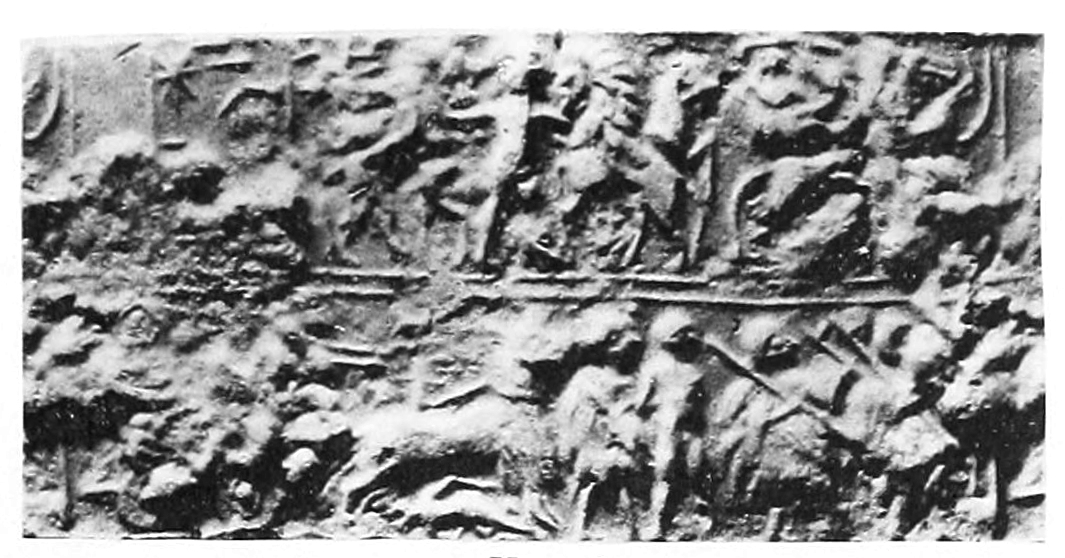
- Seal from PG 1236 with inscription "Aja-Anzu", also read "A-Imdugud". Upper register: a nude hero fighting lions. Lower register: chariotter trampling an enemy, and foot soldiers escorting a naked prisoner.

King of Ur
- Reign: c. 2600 BC
- Successor: Possibly Ur-Pabilsag
- House: First Dynasty of Ur

Location of Ur

A-Imdugud (𒀀𒀭𒅎𒂂 A^{D}IM.DUGUD^{MUŠEN}, named after God Imdugud, also read Aja-Anzu; fl. c. 2600 BC), was an early ruler of the First Dynasty of Ur in the 27th century BCE. He does not appear in the Sumerian King List, but is known from an inscribed seal found in tomb PG 1236 in the Royal Cemetery at Ur, which is the largest and probably the earliest tomb structure at the cemetery.

== Tomb ==
Several artefacts are known from tomb PG 1236, a twin tomb at the Royal Cemetery at Ur, although the tomb was robbed in the past. Two inscribed seals were found, one is a banquet scene with an inscription Gan-Ekiga(k), and another with the depiction of a nude hero fighting lions and a war scene reminiscent of the Standard of Ur, with the name Aja-Anzu, also read A-Imdugud. This seals is very similar to the seal of Mesannepada. Gold leaves with embossed designs, as well as a reconstituted gold scepter, have also been found in the tomb.

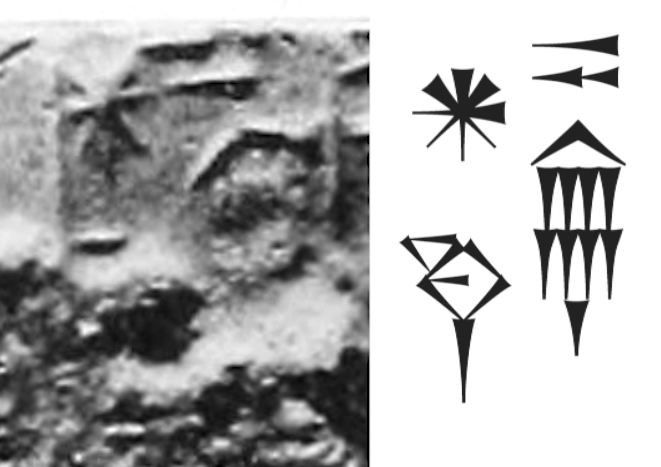
The name "A-Imdugud" on the seal

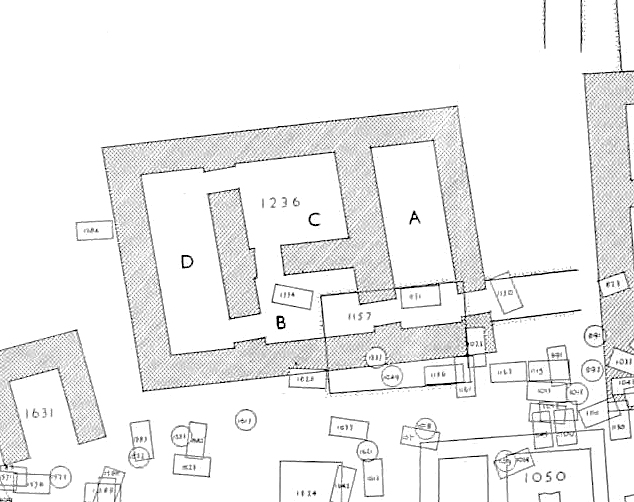
Plan of tomb PG 1236, with three chambers, thought to belong to A-Imdugud. Royal Cemetery of Ur.

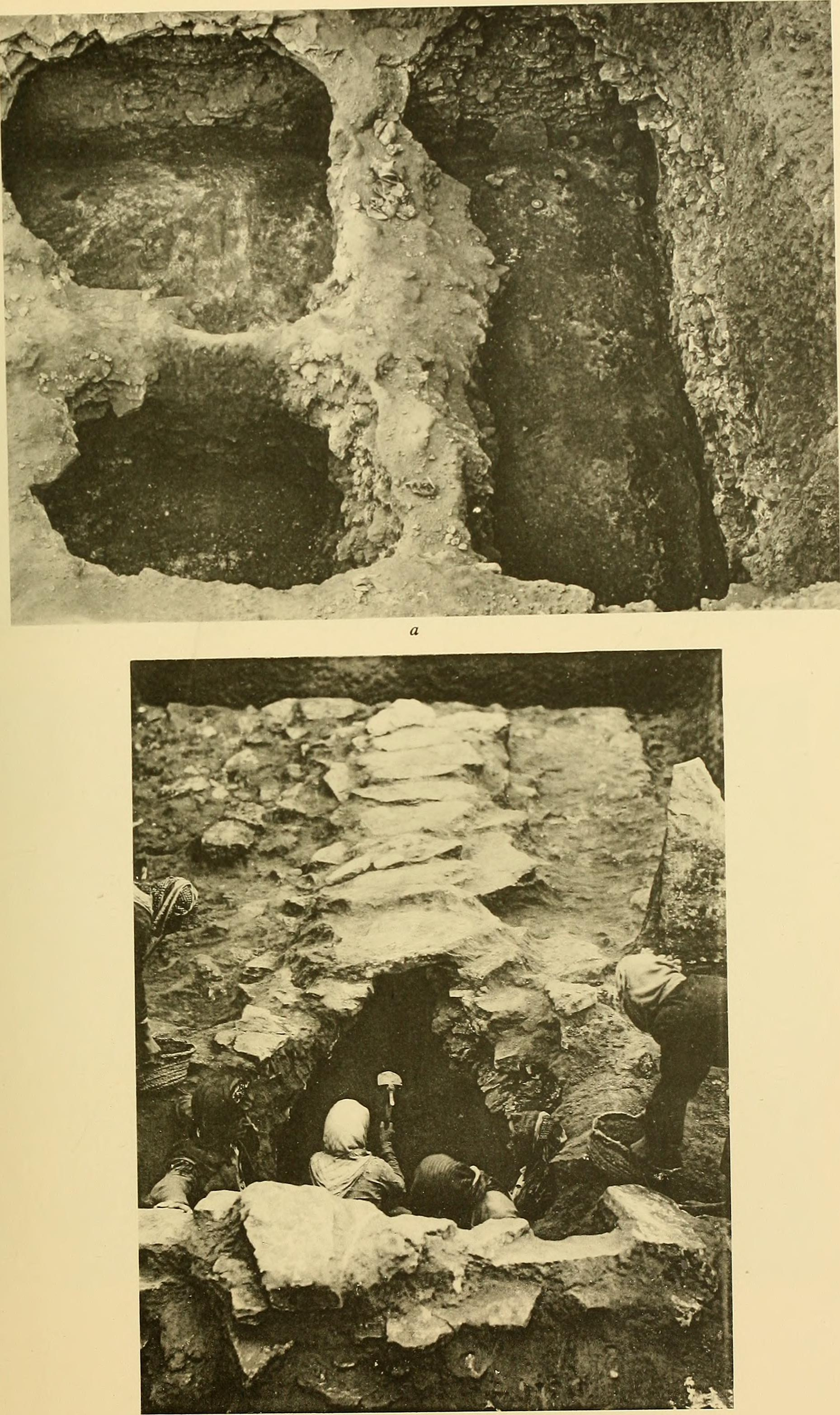
Tomb PG 1236, at the Royal Cemetery of Ur. Domed chambers seen from above, and robbers' hole.

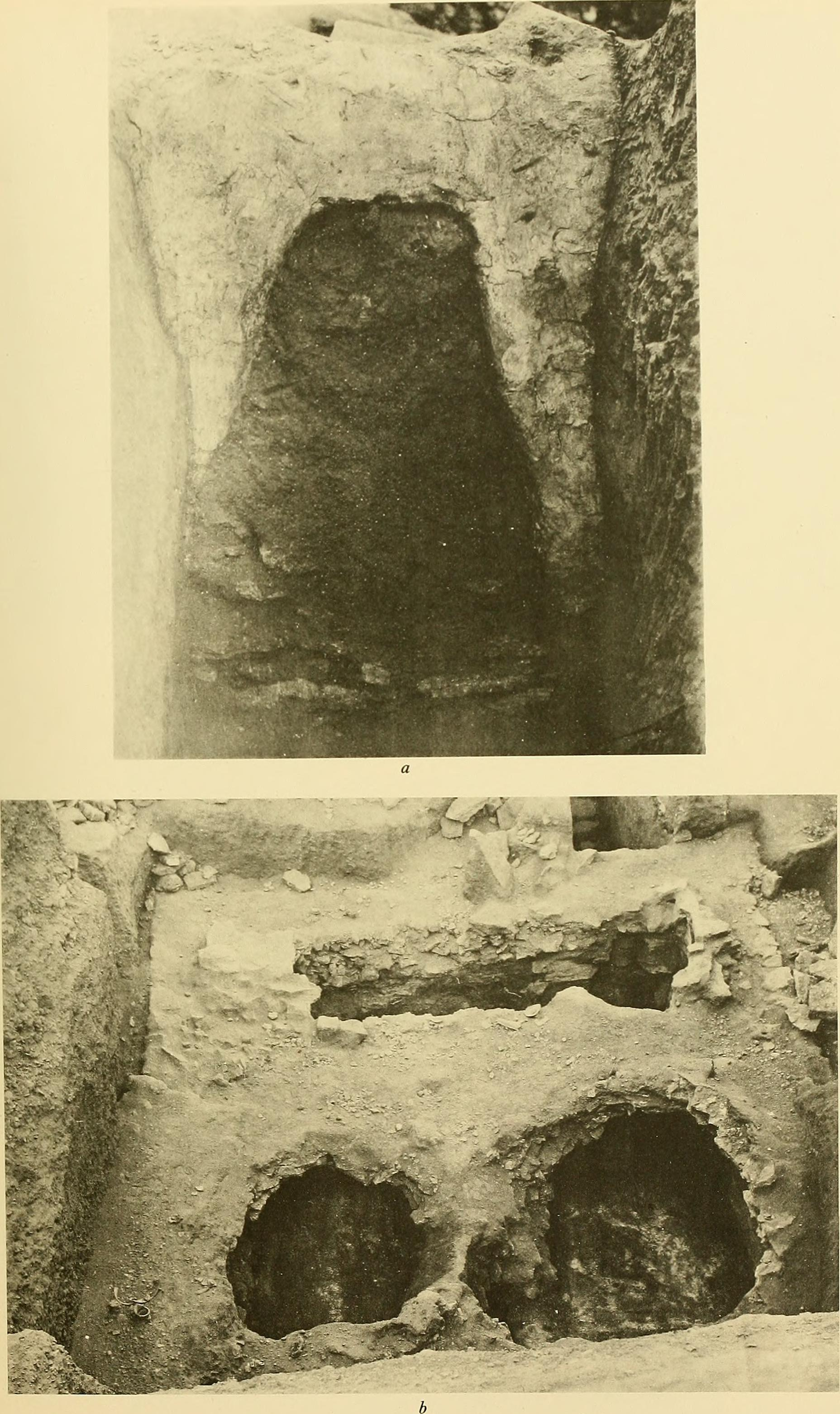
Tomb PG 1236, at the Royal Cemetery of Ur. Doorway, and domed tomb chambers seen from above.

=== Artifacts ===
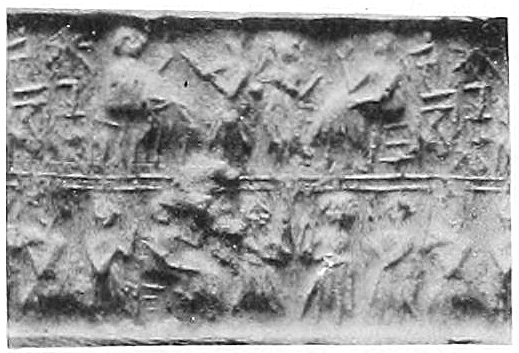
Banquet scene with an inscription Gan-Ekiga(k), PG 1236

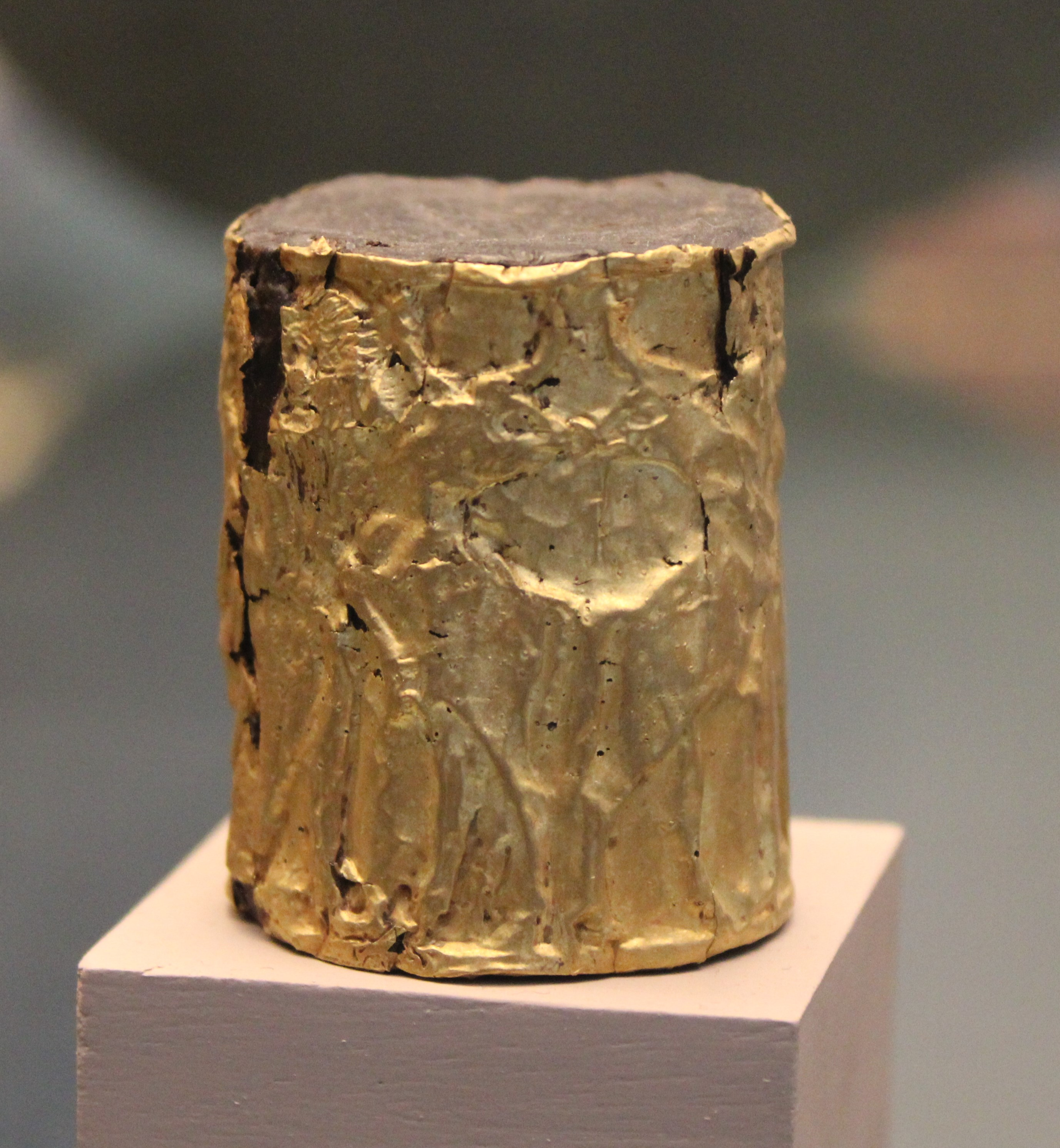
Gold foil, tomb PG 1236

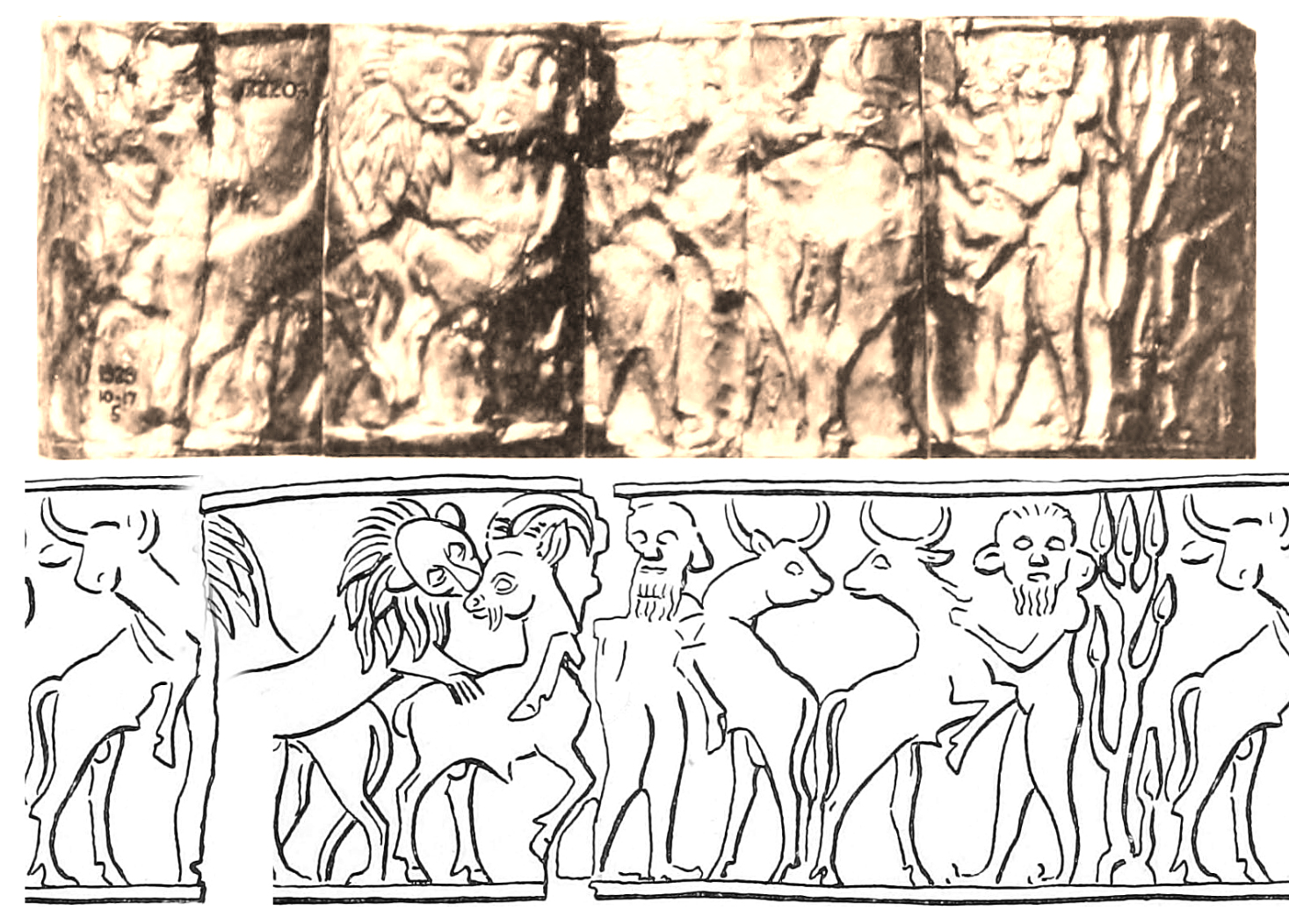
Design embossed on the gold foil, tomb PG 1236, thought to belong to A-Imdugud, Royal Cemetery of Ur

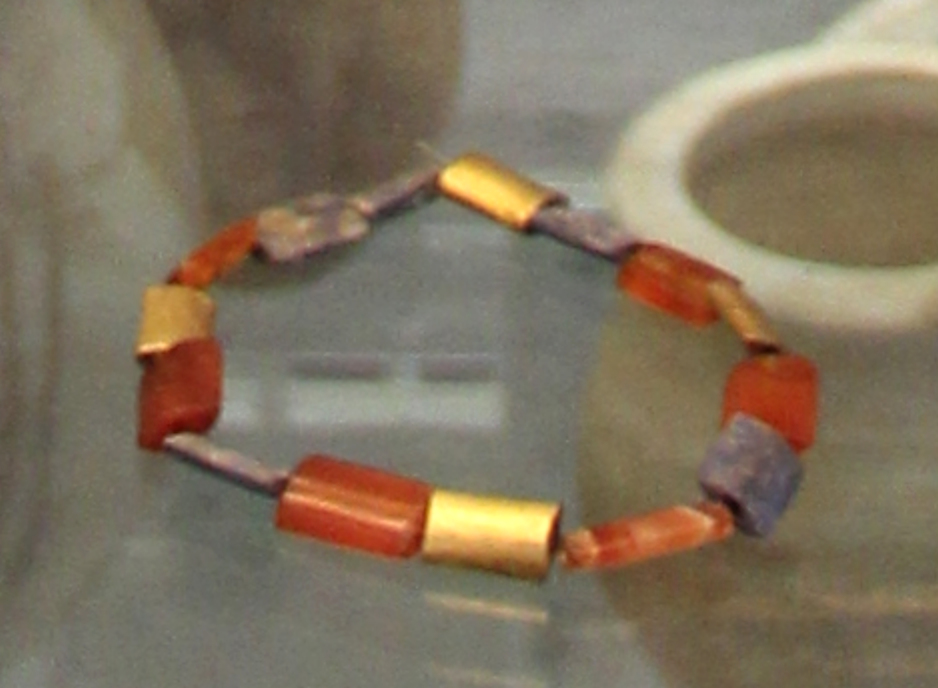
Gold, carnelian and lapis-lazuli beads, tomb PG 1236

==== Royal scepter ====
A gold scepter was also found in tomb PG 1236.

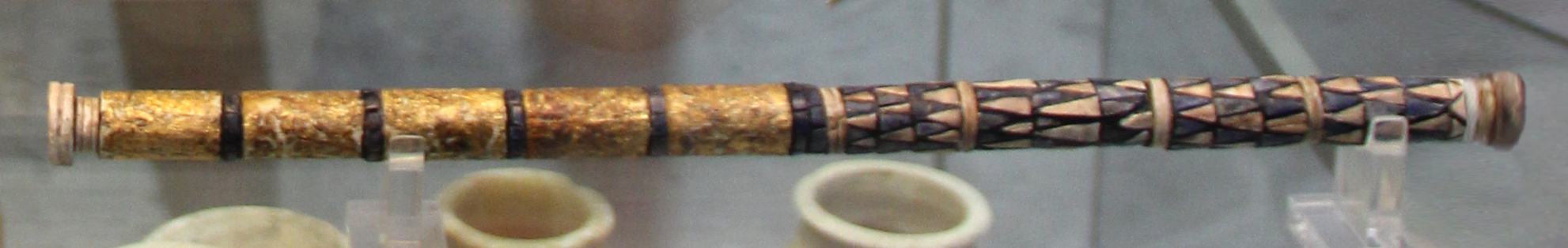
Scepter, tomb PG 1236

== See also ==
- Sumer
- History of Sumer
- Royal Cemetery at Ur
- Near Eastern archaeology

== Sources ==
- Jane McIntosh: Ancient Mesopotamia. ABC-CLIO 2005, ISBN 1-57607-965-1, p. 73 (restricted online version (google books))
- Leonard Woolley: The Sumerians. p. 38 (restricted online version (google books))

Regnal titles
Preceded by	King of Ur c. 2600 BC	Succeeded by Possibly Ur-Pabilsag
