= Akalamdug =

Akalamdug 𒀀𒌦𒄭
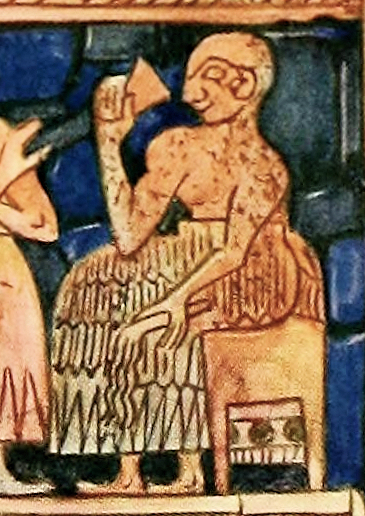
- Seated King on a shell plaque from a lyre, found in tomb PG 1332, Royal Cemetery at Ur. Tomb PG 1332 is thought to belong to King Akalamdug.

King of Ur
- Reign: c. 2550 BC
- Predecessor: Possibly Meskalamdug
- Successor: Possibly Mesannepada
- Spouse: Ašusikildigira
- House: First Dynasty of Ur

Location of Ur

Akalamdug (𒀀𒌦𒄭, A-KALAM-DUG; fl. c. 2550 BC) was an early ruler of the First Dynasty of Ur in the 26th century BCE. He does not appear in the Sumerian King List, but is known from his tomb (Tomb 1332) and an inscription at the Royal Cemetery at Ur. He may have been the father of Meskalamdug, as suggested by the similarity of their names and the chronological proximity of their graves. Alternatively, he may have been the son of Meskalamdug, and therefore brother of the great ruler Mesannepada.

== Artefacts ==
Several artefacts are known from tomb 1332 at the Royal Cemetery at Ur, such as bull heads and decorated shell plaques from a lyre.

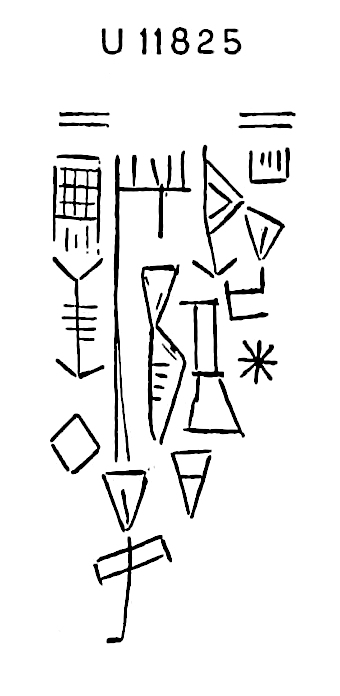
Inscription related to Akalamdug at the Royal Cemetery at Ur: ".. Ur King Akalamdug"

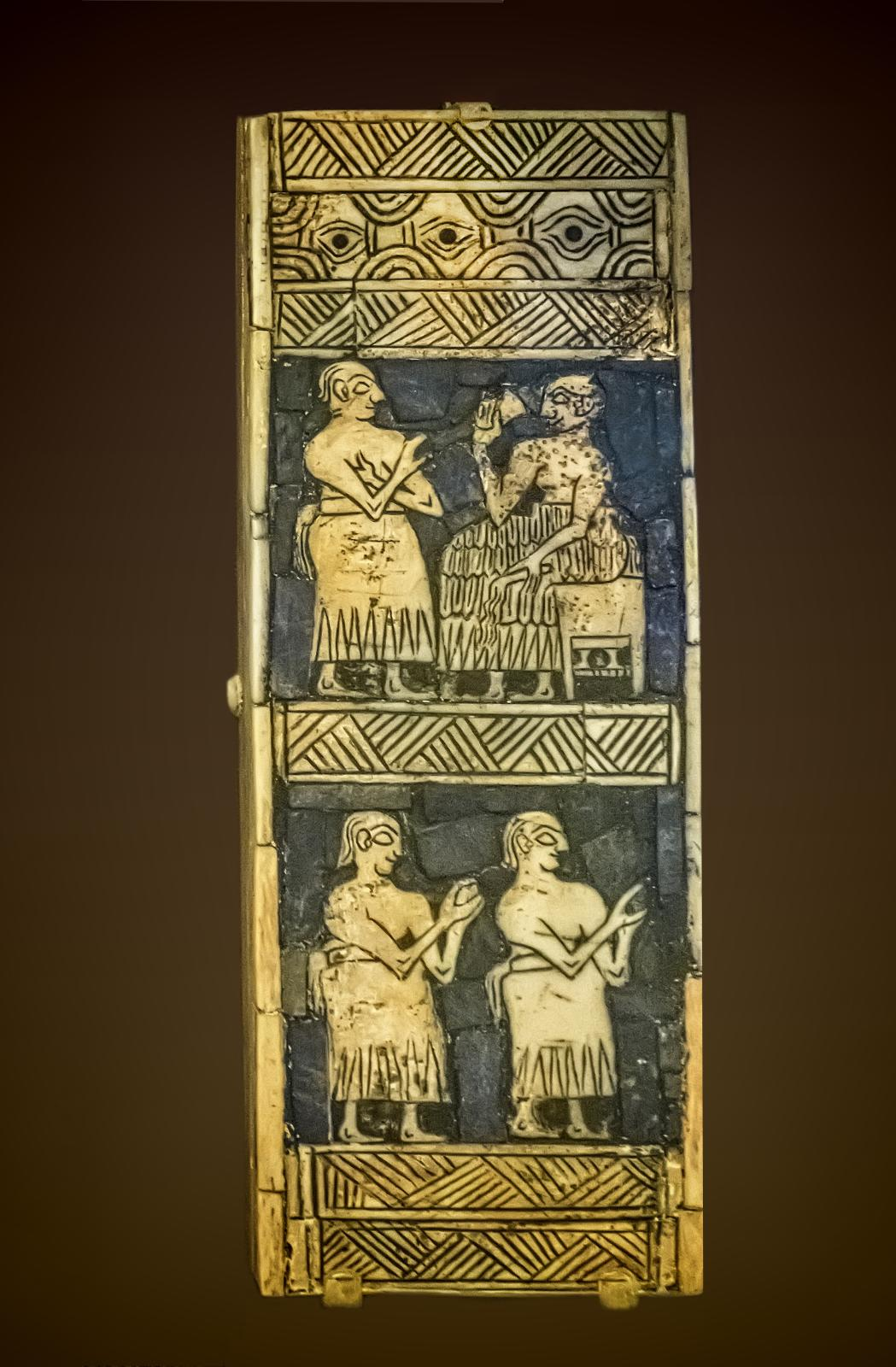
Shell plaque from a lyre, found in tomb PG 1332, Ur Royal Cemetery

== See also ==
- Sumer
- History of Sumer
- Royal Cemetery at Ur
- Near Eastern archaeology

== Sources ==
- Jane McIntosh: Ancient Mesopotamia. ABC-CLIO 2005, ISBN 1-57607-965-1, p. 73 (restricted online version (google books))
- Leonard Woolley: The Sumerians. p. 38 (restricted online version (google books))

Regnal titles
Preceded by Possibly Meskalamdug	King of Ur c. 2550 BC	Succeeded by Possibly Mesannepada
