= A'annepada =

A'annepada 𒀀𒀭𒉌𒅆𒊒𒁕
- King of Kish
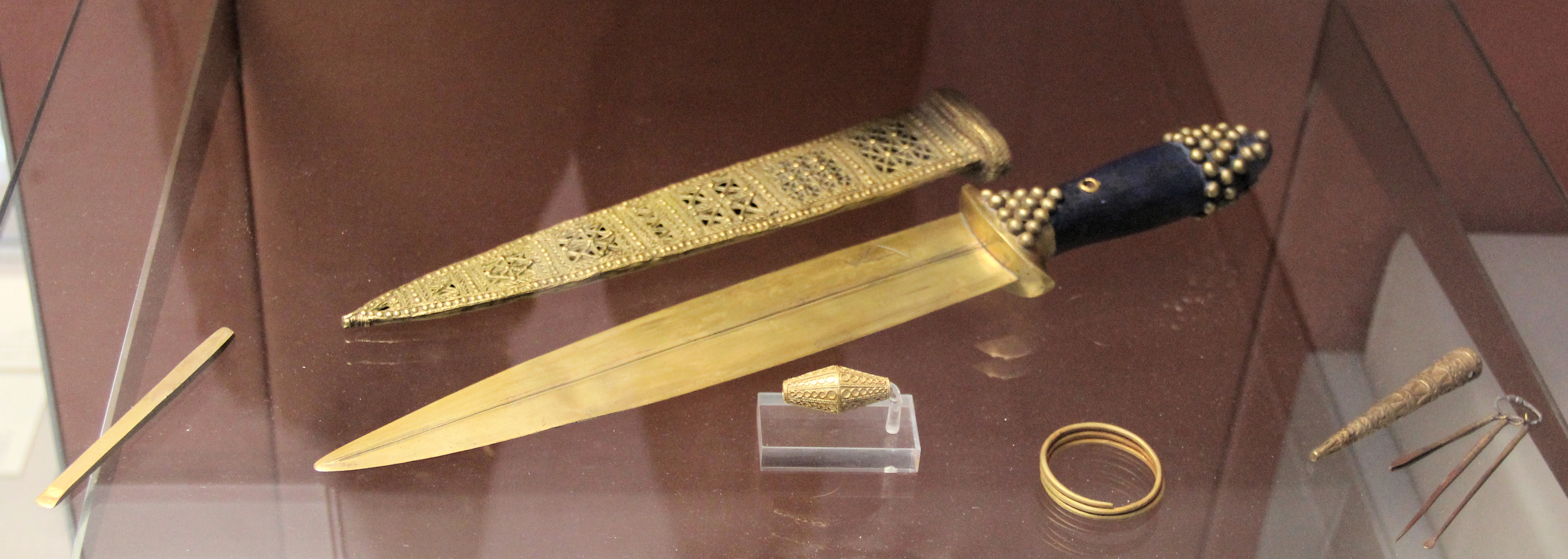
- Gold dagger from tomb PG 580, thought to belong to A'anepada

King of Ur
- Reign: c. 2350 BC
- Predecessor: Possibly Balulu
- Successor: Possibly Lunanna
- House: First Dynasty of Ur
- Father: Mesannepada

Location of Ur

A'annepada (Sumerian: 𒀀𒀭𒉌𒅆𒊒𒁕, romanized: Aanépàdda; fl. c. 2350 BC) was a king of the First Dynasty of Ur. He was a son of Mesannepada. It is thought that his tomb may be tomb PG 580 in the Royal Cemetery at Ur.

== Votive tablets ==
Several tablets are known that bear his name, in particular dedicated to Ninhursag, and proclaiming Mesannepada as his father:

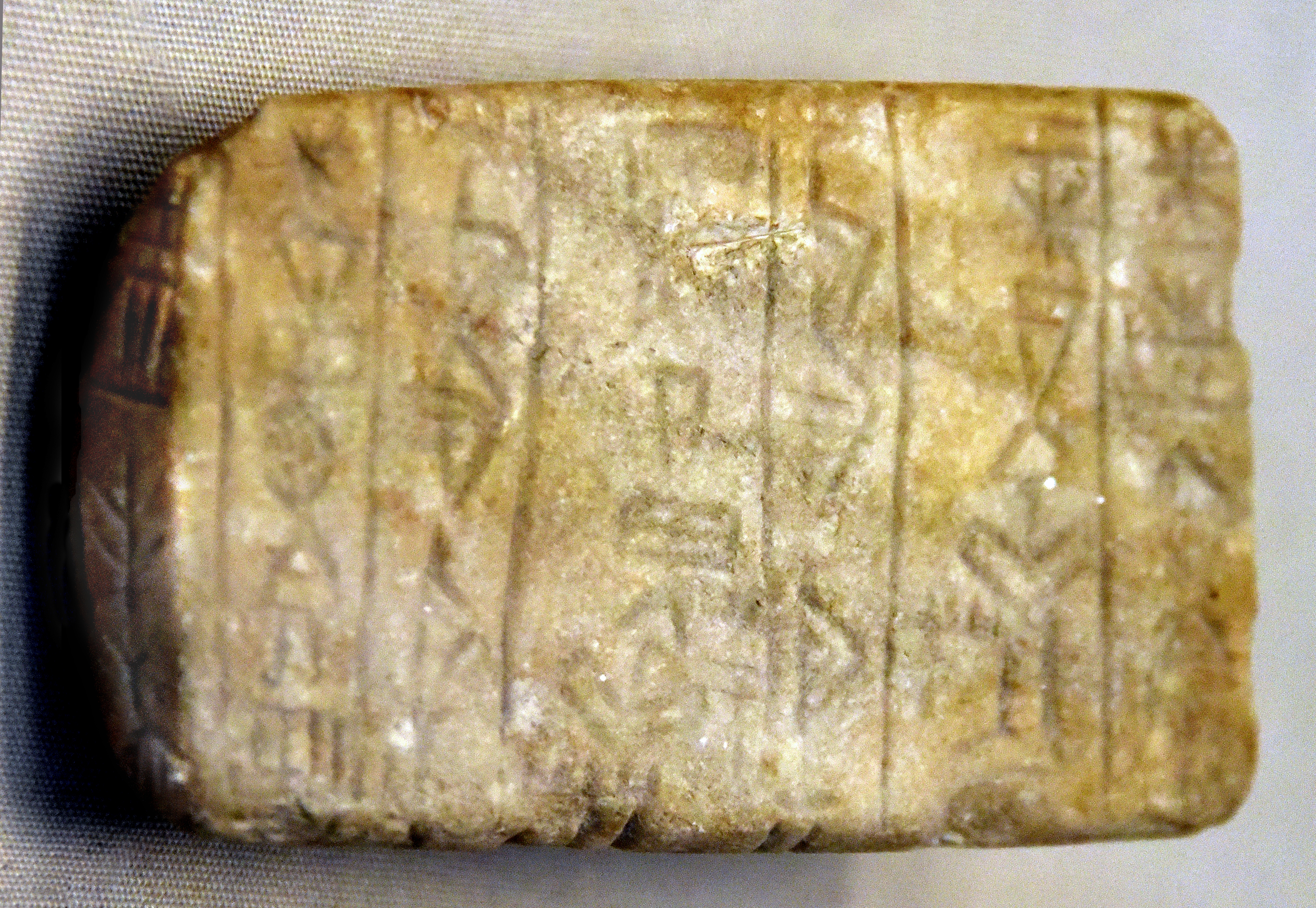
A'annepada tablet inscription. British Museum.

𒀭𒊩𒌆𒄯𒊕 / 𒀀𒀭𒉌𒅆𒊒𒁕 / 𒈗𒌶𒆠 / 𒌉𒈩𒀭𒉌𒅆𒊒𒁕 / 𒈗𒌶𒆠 /𒀭𒊩𒌆𒉺𒂅𒊏 / 𒂍 𒈬𒈾𒆕

^{D}nin-hur-sag / a-an-ne2-pa3-da / lugal uri5{ki} / dumu mes-an-ne2-pa3-da / lugal uri5{ki} /^{D}nin-hur-sag-ra / e2 mu-na-du3

"For Nin-hursag: A'annepada, king of Ur, son of Mesannepada, king of Ur, built the temple for Ninhursag."

— Dedication tablet by King A'annepada found at Tell al-'Ubaid, British Museum, BM 116982.

== Foundation cone ==
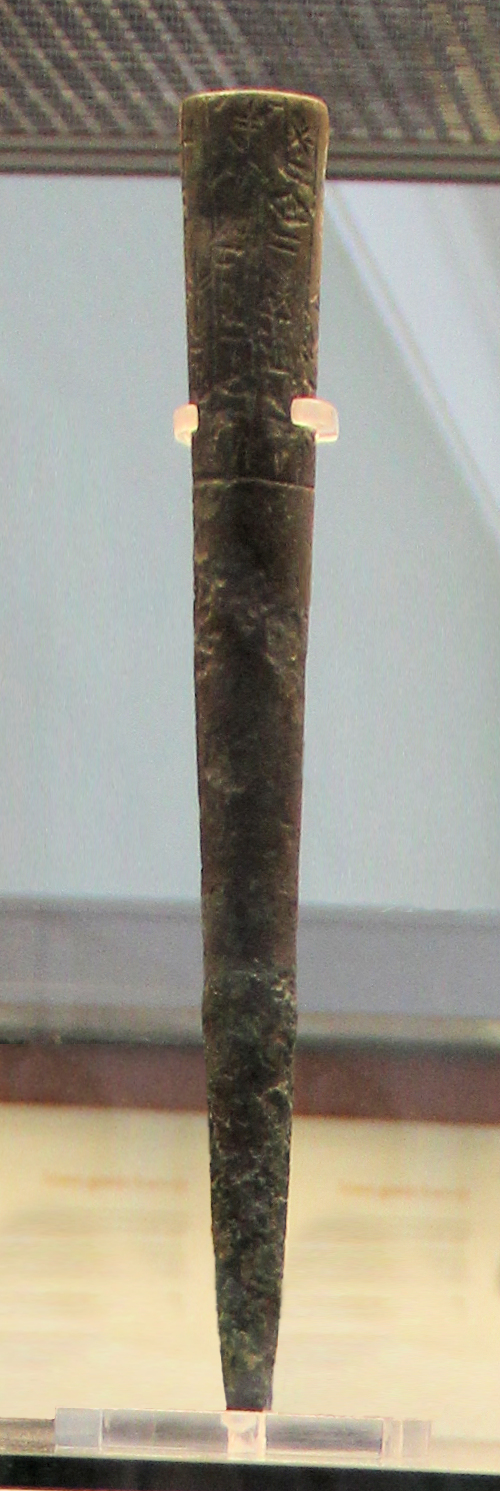
Foundation cone of A'annepada for Inanna, British Museum BM 90951

A foundation cone in a copper alloy was found in Ur, bearing the name of "King A'annepada" in a dedication for Inanna, now in the British Museum (BM 90951).

The cone was discovered by John Taylor in 1854 during his excavations in Ur. It has a length of 34.3 centimeters, a diameter of 3.7 centimeters, and weighs 1.7 kilograms. According to the British Museum, it was found together with two other objects, a carved stone with handle and a lapis lazuli portrait, which together probably formed a foundation deposit.

The actual content of the inscription had been overlooked, until it was published by J.C. Gadd in 1928.

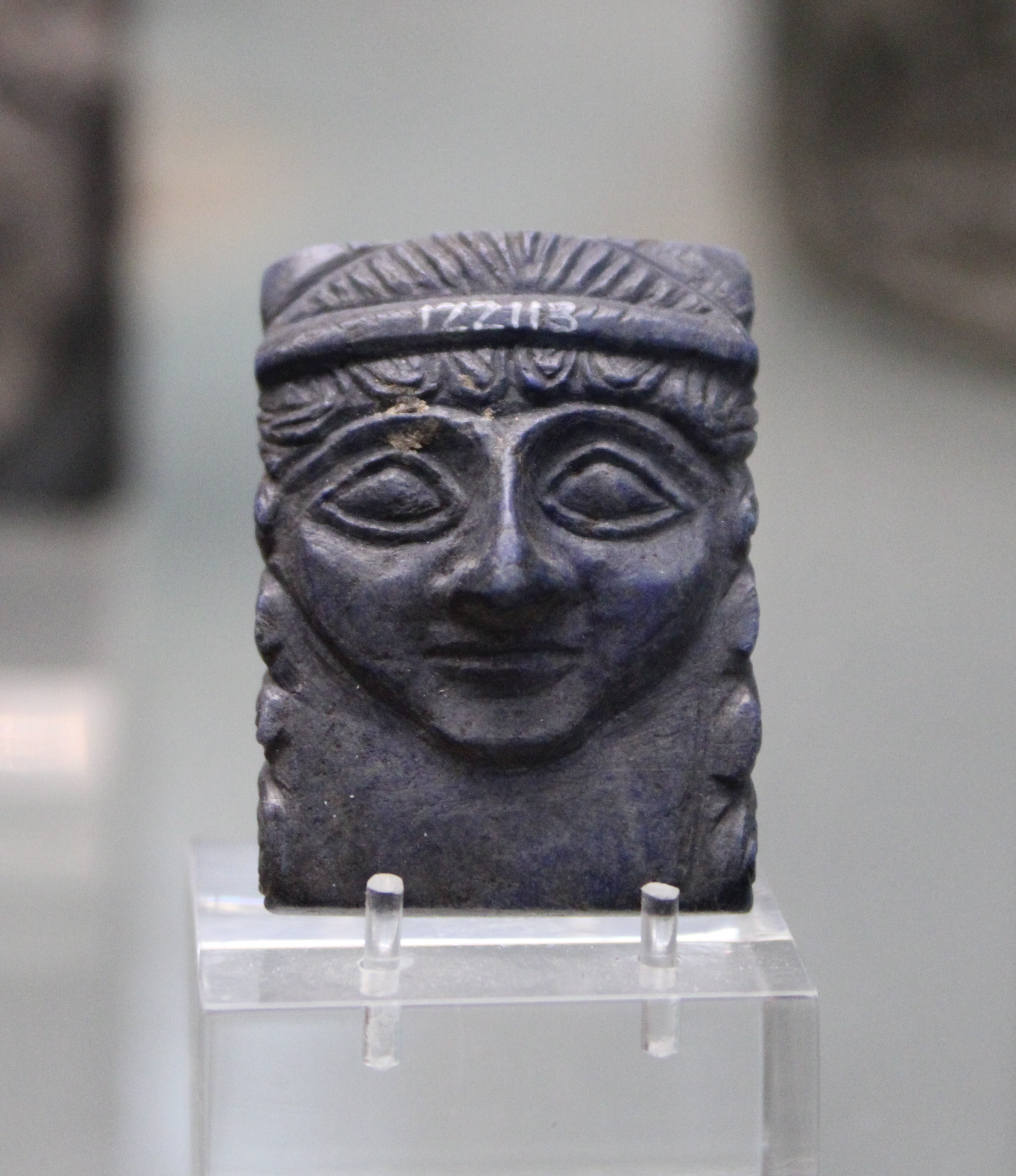
Lapis lazuli female portrait found with the cone in the same foundation deposit.

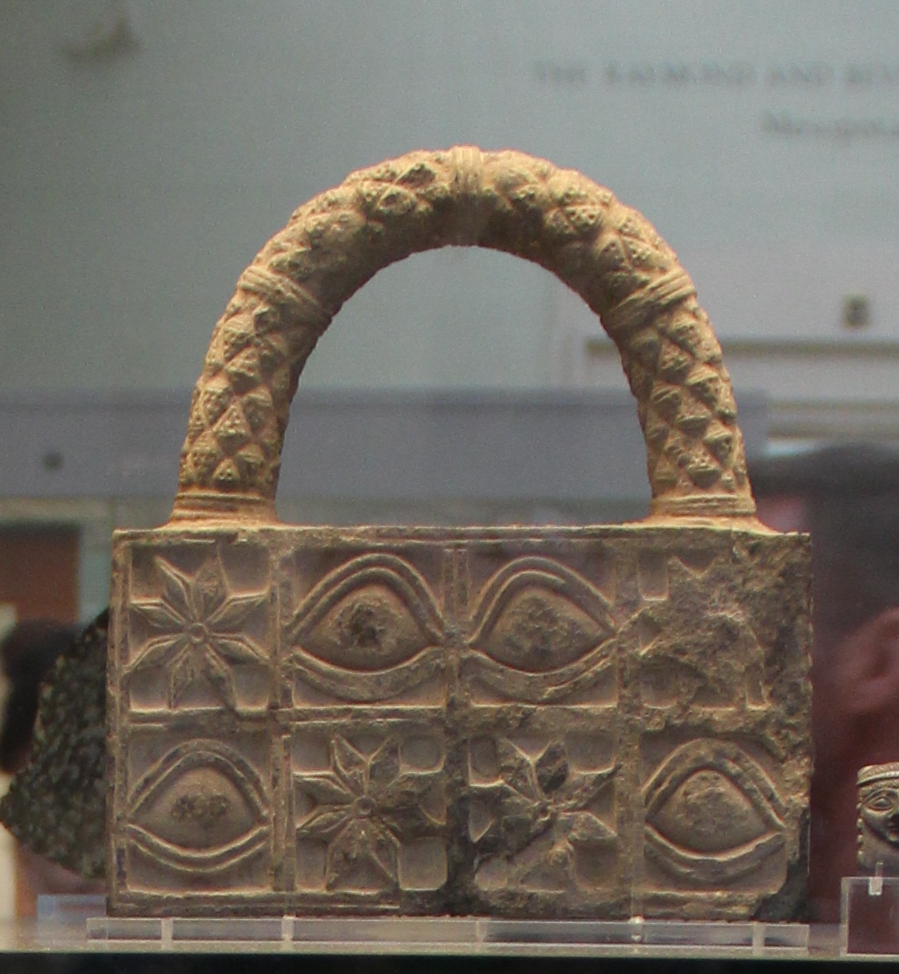
Carved stone with handle, from the same foundation deposit. It is probably Elamite in origin. The motif was reused on the white platform in The Babylonian Marriage Market.

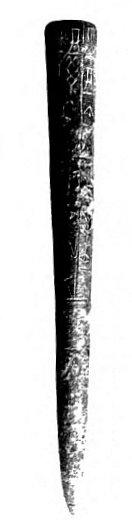
A'annepada foundation cone in 1915, before decipherement

== Artifacts from tomb PG 580 at Ur ==
It has been suggested that the tomb of A'annepada may be tomb PG 580 in the Royal Cemetery at Ur.

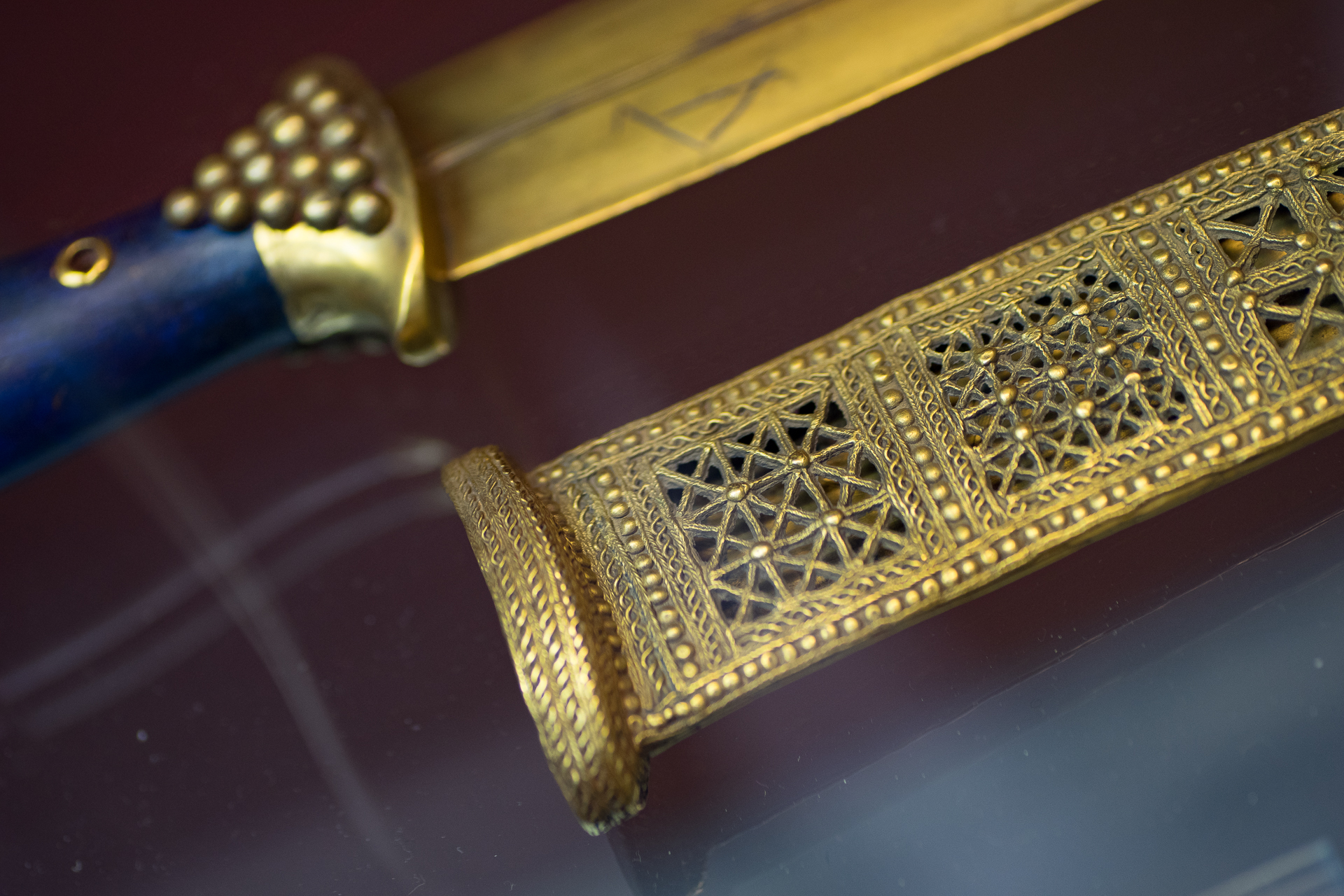
Dagger

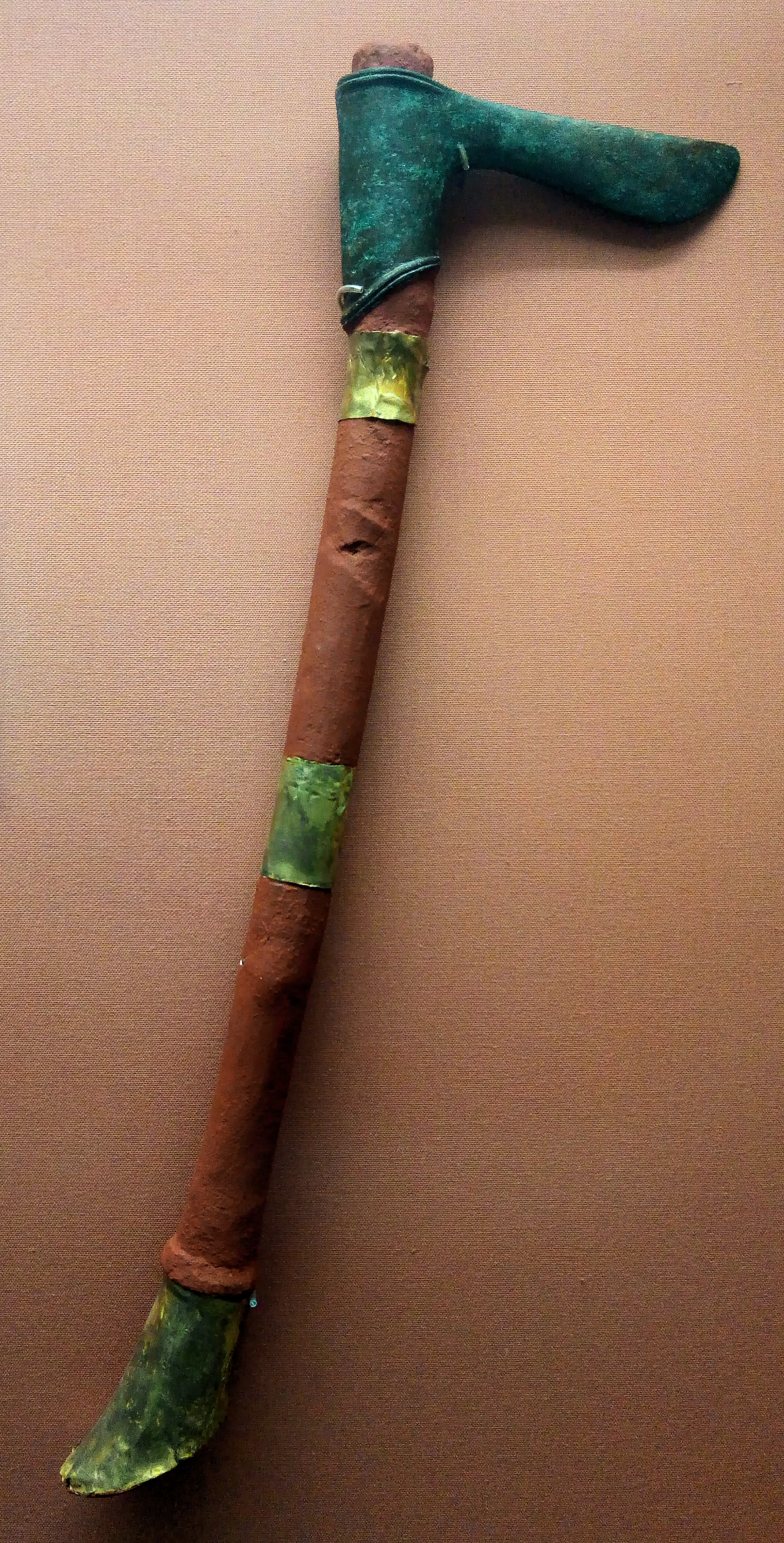
Copper alloy axe

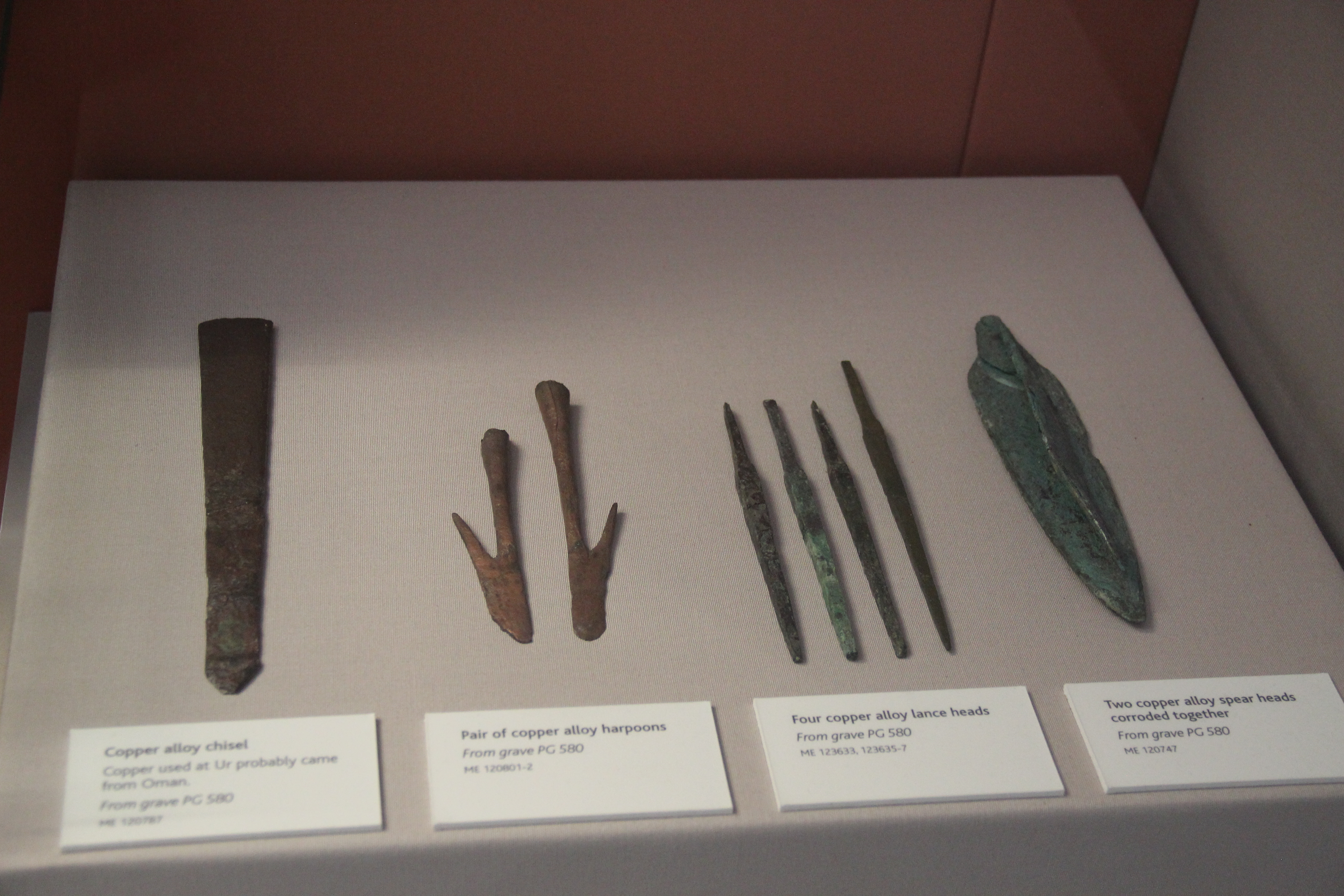
Copper Alloy Chisel, Harpoons, Lance and Spear Heads.

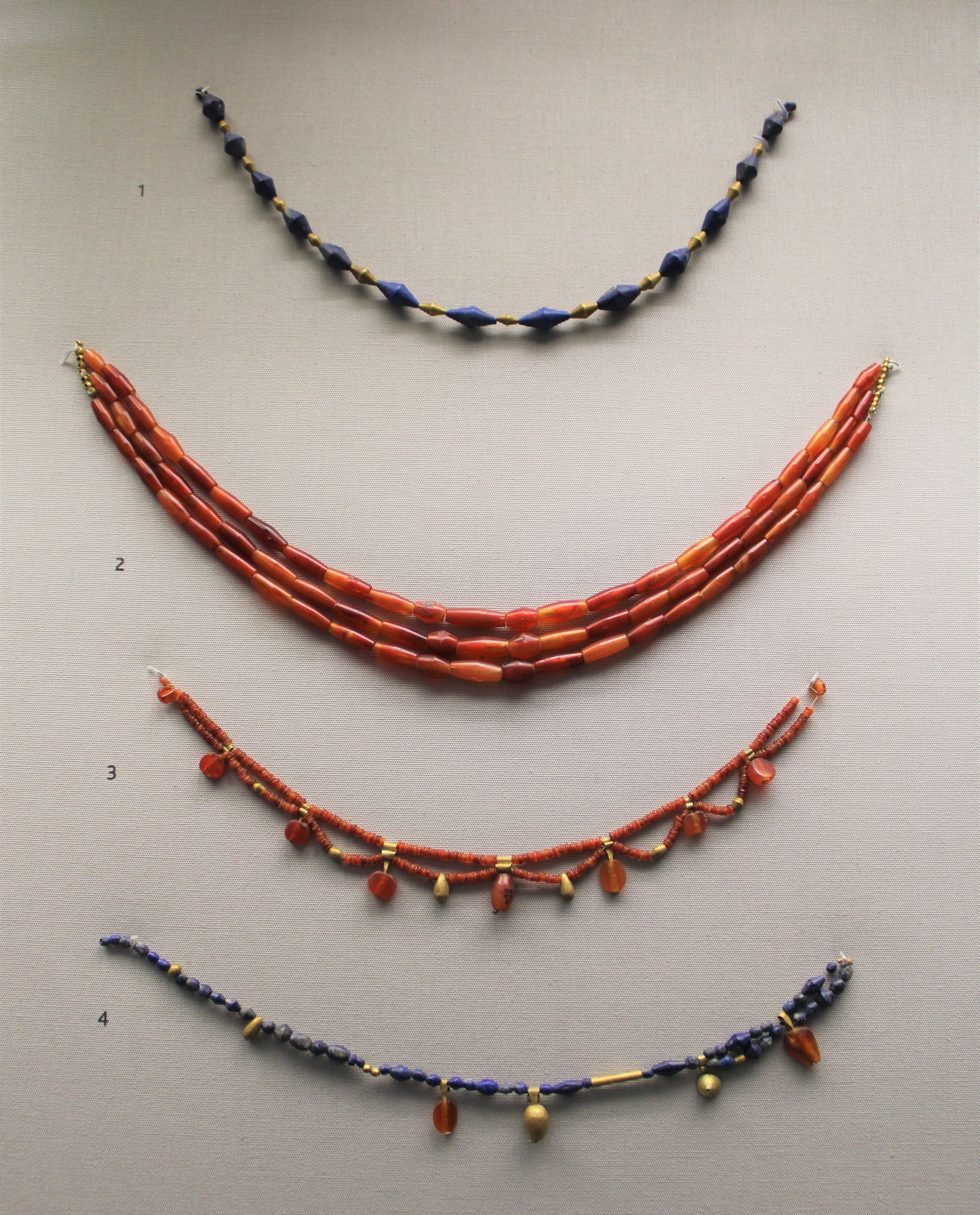
Jewellery PG 580

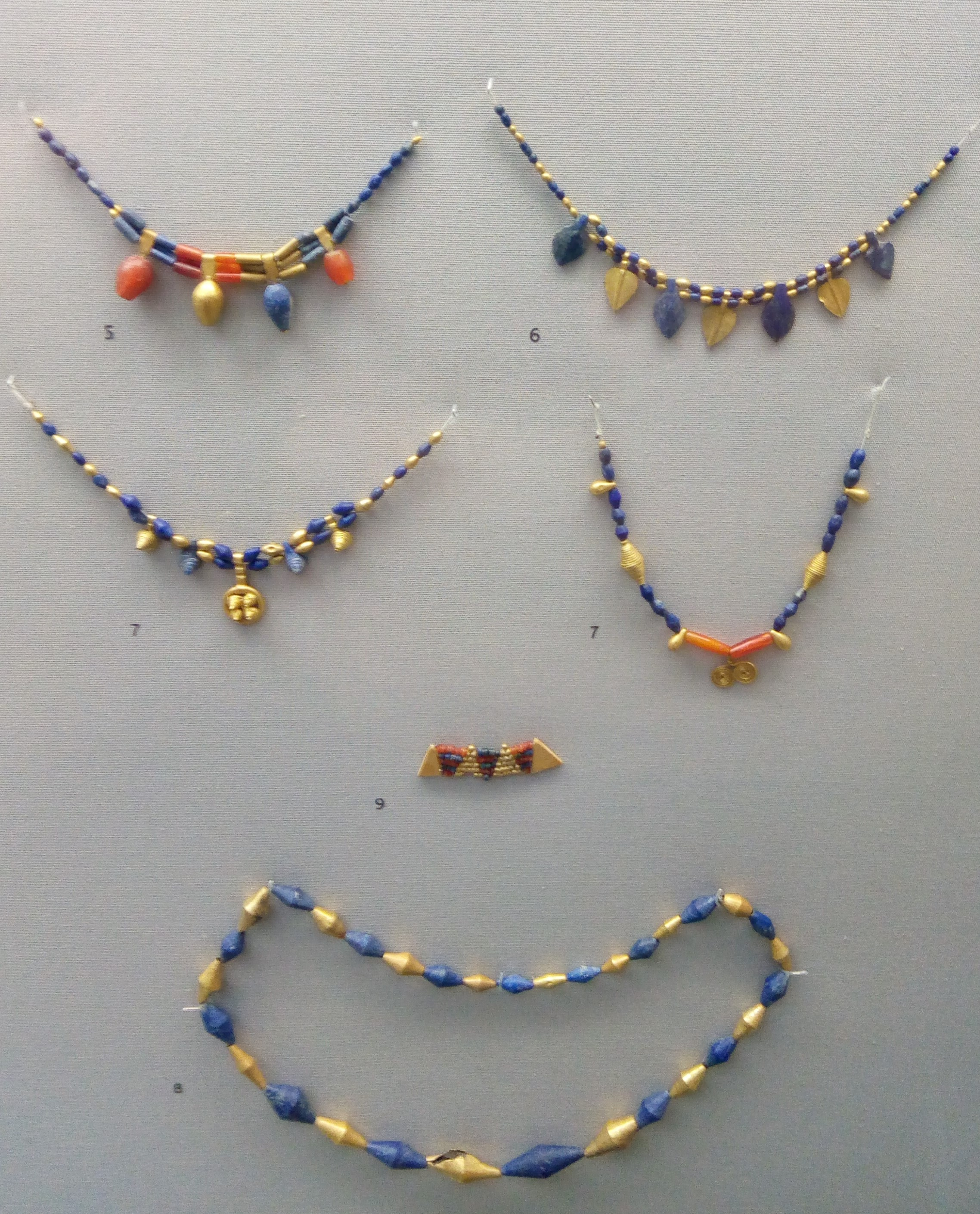
Jewellery PG 580

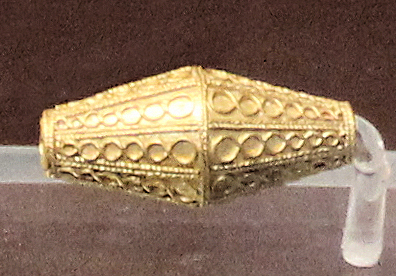
Bead with filigree and cloisons, PG 580, British Museum BM 121427

Regnal titles
Preceded by Possibly Balulu	King of Sumer c. 2350 BC	Succeeded by Possibly Lunanna
Preceded by Possibly Balulu	Ensí of Ur c. 2350 BC	Succeeded by Possibly Lunanna
