= Mesannepada =

Mesannepada 𒈩𒀭𒉌𒅆𒊒𒁕
- King of Kish
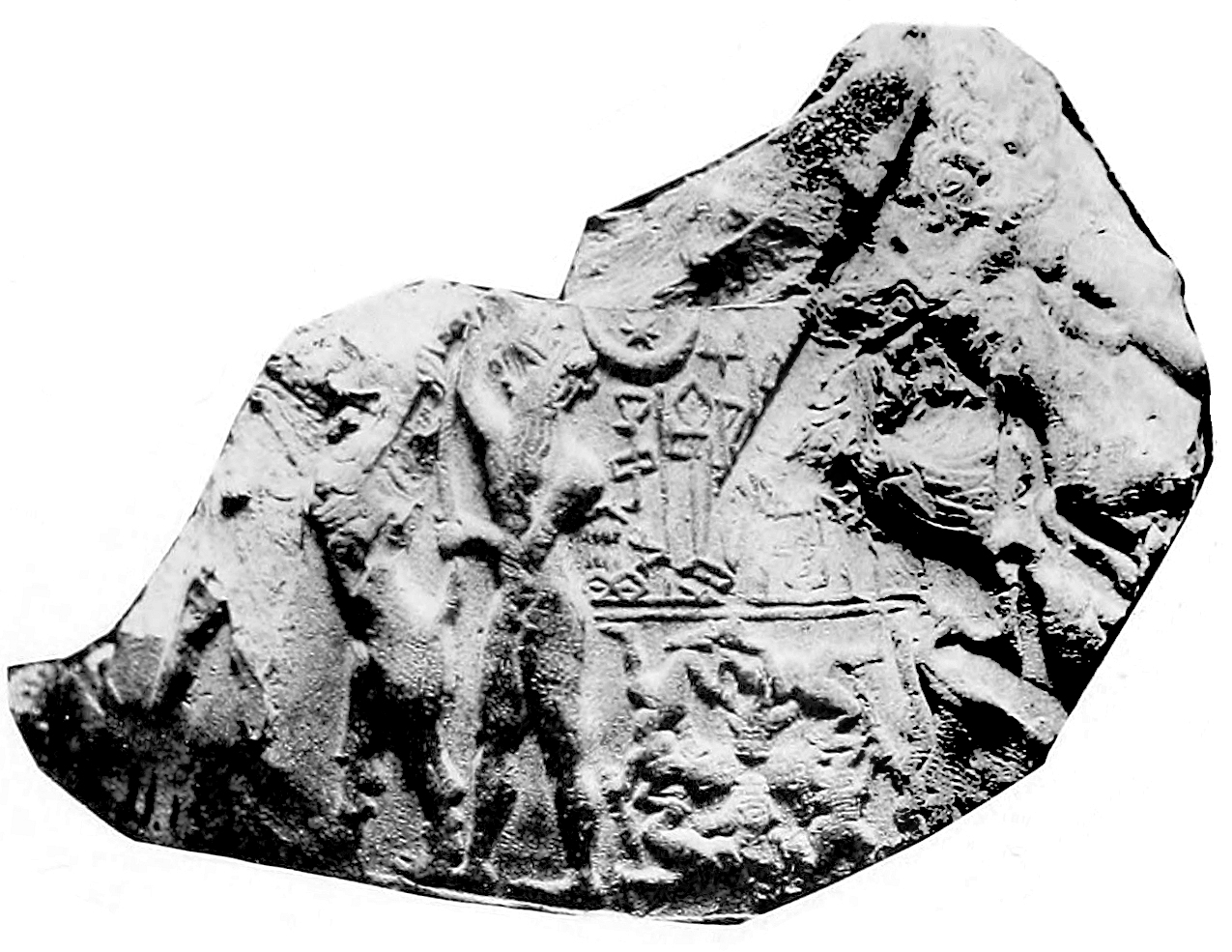
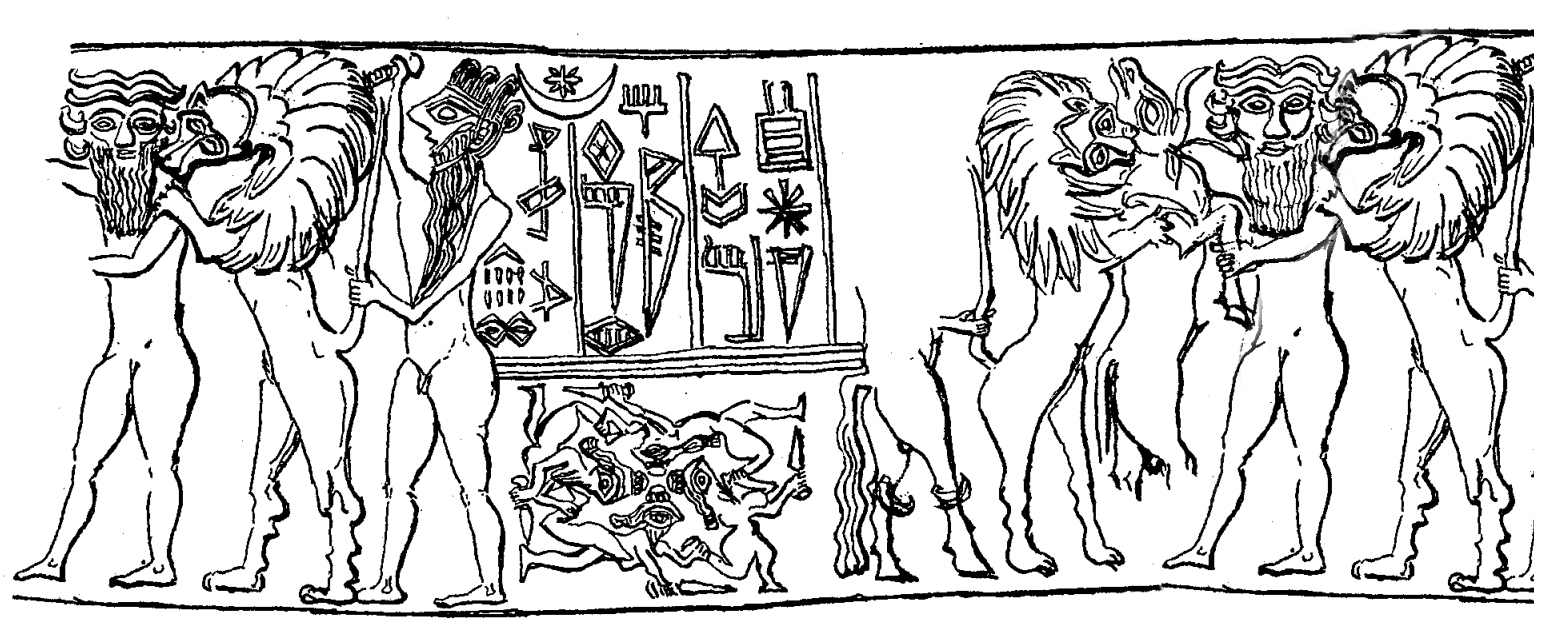
- Cylinder seal impression of "Mesanepada, king of Kish", excavated in the Royal Cemetery at Ur (U. 13607). The seal shows Gilgamesh and the mythical bull between two lions, one of the lions biting him in the shoulder. On each side of this group appears Enkidu and a hunter-hero, with a long beard and a Kish-style headdress, armed with a dagger. Under the text, four runners with beard and long hair form a human Swastika. They are armed with daggers and catch each other's foot. University of Pennsylvania. Museum of Archaeology and Anthropology, UPM 31.16.677.

King of Ur
- Reign: c. 2550 – c. 2525 BC
- Predecessor: Possibly Akalamdug
- Successor: Possibly A'annepada
- Died: c. 2525 BC
- Spouse: Nintur
- Issue: A'annepada; Meskiagnun
- Dynasty: 1st Dynasty of Ur
- Father: Meskalamdug

Location of Ur, Kish, and Mari

Mesannepada (Sumerian: 𒈩𒀭𒉌𒅆𒊒𒁕, Mesannipàdda [MES-AN-NE_{2}-PAD_{3}-DA]), Mesh-Ane-pada or Mes-Anne-pada ("Youngling chosen by An"; died c. 2525 BC) was the first king listed for the First Dynasty of Ur on the Sumerian king list. He is listed to have ruled for 80 years, having overthrown Lugal-kitun of Uruk: "Then Unug (Uruk) was defeated and the kingship was taken to Urim (Ur)". In one of his seals, found in the Royal Cemetery at Ur, he is also described as king of Kish.

== Filiation ==
=== The "Treasure of Ur" discovered in Mari ===
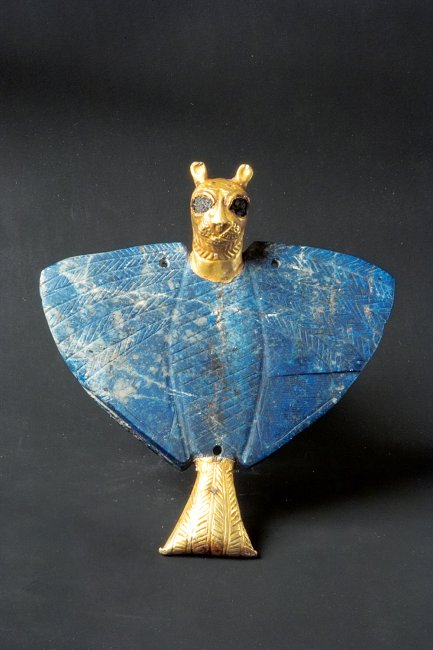
The "Lion eagle", another object found in the dedication deposit of the "Treasure of Ur"

Mesannepada was a son of Meskalamdug. A lapis-lazuli bead with the name of King Meskalamdug was found in Mari, in the so-called "Treasure of Ur", and reads:

𒀭𒈗𒌦 / 𒈩𒀭𒉌𒅆𒊒𒁕 / 𒈗𒋀𒀊𒆠 / 𒌉𒈩𒌦𒄭 / 𒈗𒆧𒆠 / 𒀀 𒈬𒈾𒊒

^{d}lugal-kalam / mes-an-ne2-pa3-da / lugal uri5^{ki} / dumu mes-ug-du10 / lugal kish^{ki} / a munaru

"To god Lugalkalam ("the Lord of the Land", identified with Dagan or Enlil), Mesannepada, king of Ur, son of Meskalamdug, king of Kish, has consecrated this bead"

— Mesannepada Mari bead

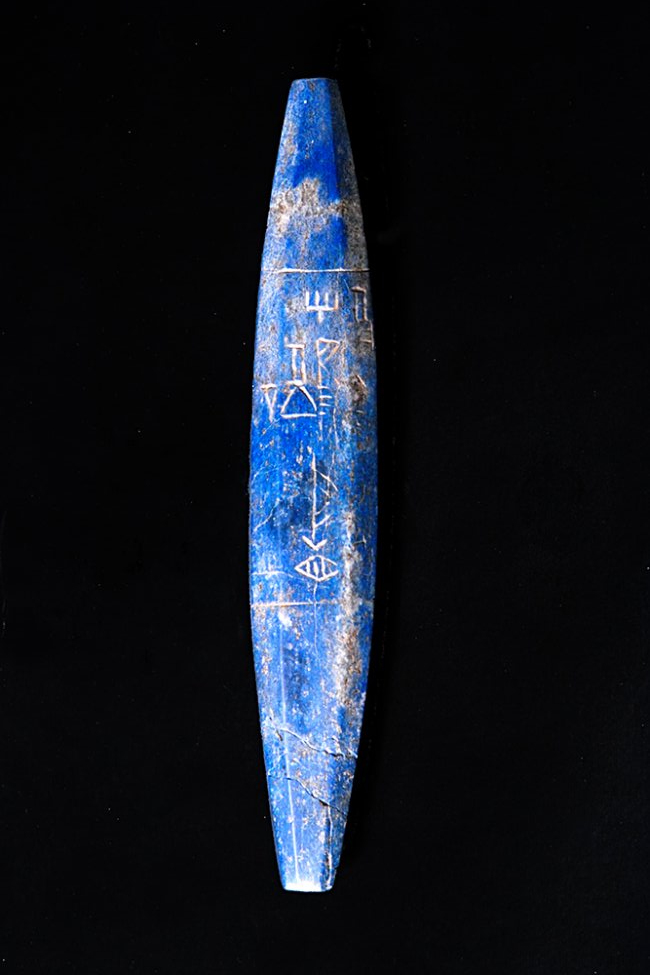
The lapis lazuli bead from Mari, National Museum of Damascus, Syria ("King of Ur", 𒈗𒋀𒀊𒆠 side)

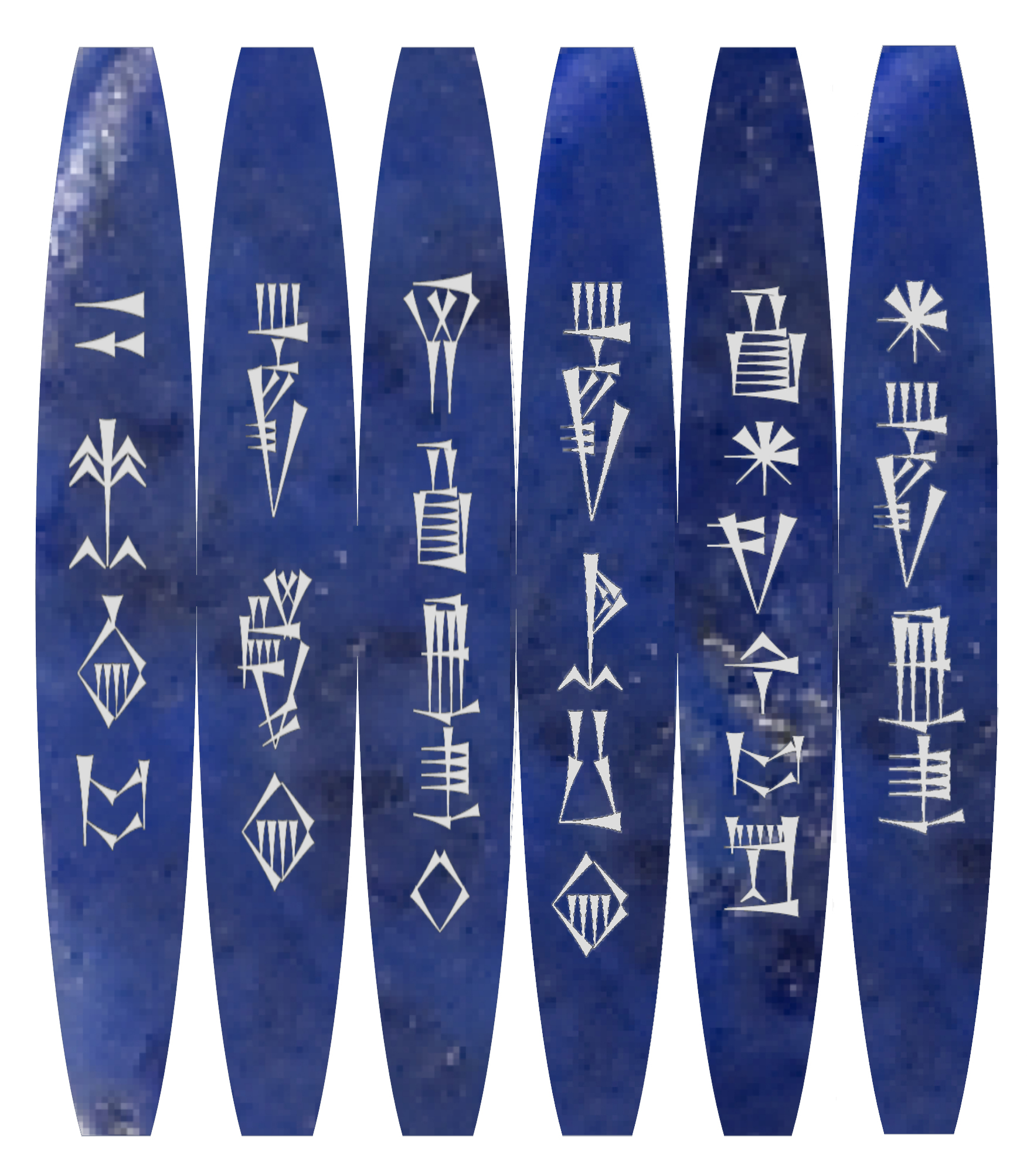
Transcription of the Mari bead

Initially, it was thought that this bead (reference M. 4439) referred to a gift by Mesannepada to a king of Mari named Gansud or Ansud. This has now been corrected with the translation given above. The God "Lugal-kalam" (𒀭𒈗𒌦, "Lord of the Land") to whom the dedication is made, is otherwise known in a dedication by a local ruler Šaba (Šalim) of Mari, also as Lugal-kalam, or in the dedication of Ishtup-Ilum where he is named "Lugal-mātim" (𒀭𒈗𒈤𒁴, "Lord of the Land"), and is considered identical with the local deity Dagan, or Enlil.

It is unclear how this bead came to be in Mari, but this points to some kind of relation between Ur and Mari at that time. The bead was discovered in a jar containing other objects from Ur or Kish, the so-called "Treasure of Ur". The jar was recognized as an offering for the foundation of a temple in Mari. Similar dedication beads have also been found from later rulers, such as Shulgi who engraved two carnelian beads with dedication to his gods c. 2100 BC.

=== A'annepada dedication tablet ===
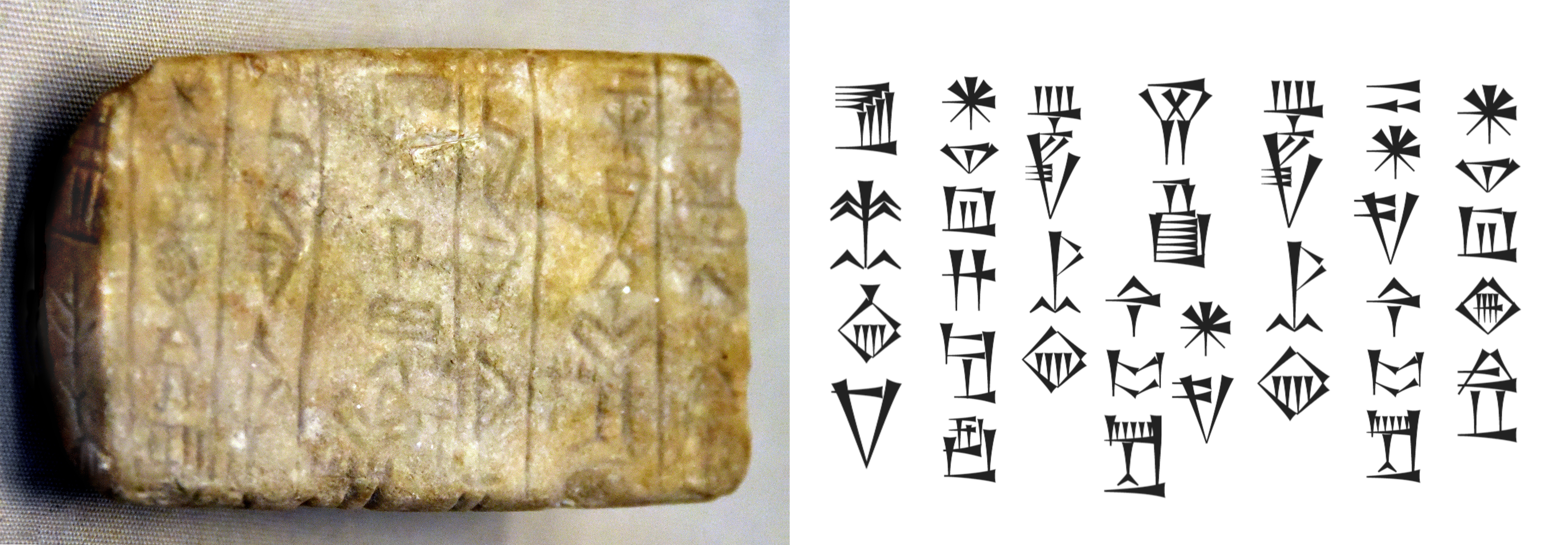
A'annepada tablet inscription (with transcription in standard Sumero-Akkadian cuneiform), mentioning his father Mesannepada. British Museum, BM 116982. Discovered in Tell Al-'Ubaid.

Several dedication tablets by "A'annepada, son of Mesannepada" for the god Ninhursag are also known, which all have similar content:

^{D}nin-hur-sag / a-an-ne2-pa3-da / lugal uri5{ki} / dumu mes-an-ne2-pa3-da / lugal uri5{ki} /^{D}nin-hur-sag-ra / e2 mu-na-du3
"For Nin-hursag: A'annepada, king of Ur, son of Mesannepada, king of Ur, built the temple for Ninhursag."

— Dedication tablet by King A'annepada, British Museum, BM 116982.

=== Sumerian King List ===
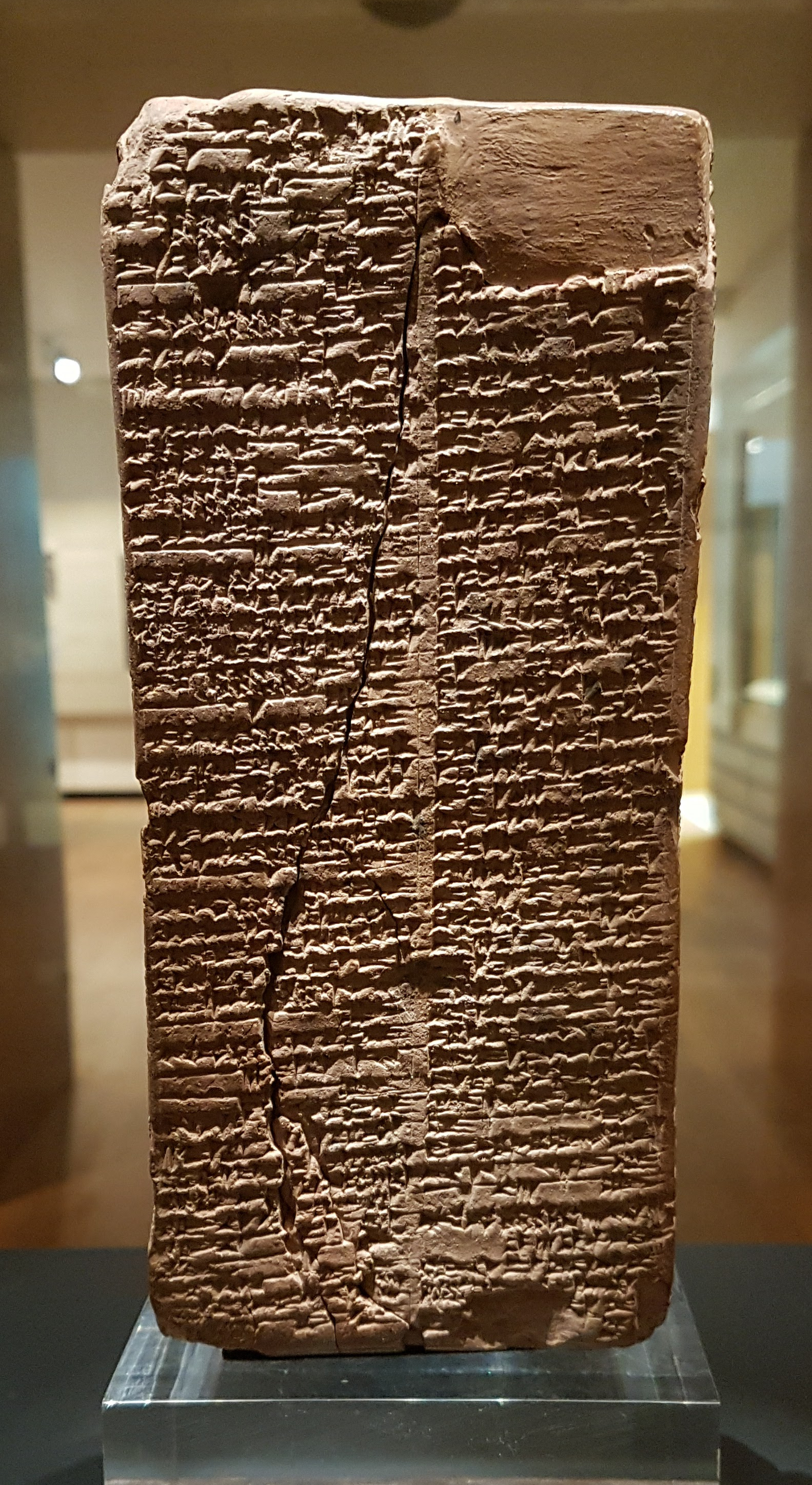
Mesannepada appears in the Sumerian King List, as the first ruler of the First Dynasty of Ur

Mesannepada appears in the Sumerian King List, as the first ruler of the First Dynasty of Ur, and is credited with a reign of 80 years. His successors are also named:

"... Uruk with weapons was struck down, the kingship to Ur was carried off. In Ur Mesannepada was king, 80 years he ruled; Meskiagnun, son of Mesannepada, was king, 36 years he ruled; Elulu, 25 years he ruled; Balulu, 36 years he ruled; 4 kings, the years: 171(?) they ruled. Ur with weapons was struck down; the kingship to Awan was carried off.

— Sumerian King List, 137-147.

It is considered unlikely for a king to inherit a throne in his childhood and reign thereafter for 80 years. The length of the son's reign was probably added to that of the father.

=== Old Babylonian tablet: the Tummal Chronicle ===
Mesannepada and his other son are also mentioned in an Old Babylonian tablet (1900-1600 BC), the Tummal Inscription, relating the accomplishments of several kings. Such tablets are usually copies of older tablets, now lost:

"En-me-barage-si, the king, built the Iri-nanam in Enlil's temple. Aga, son of En-me-barage-si, made the Tummal flourish and brought Ninlil into the Tummal. Then the Tummal fell into ruins for the first time. Meš-Ane-pada built the Bur-šušua in Enlil's temple. Meskiagnun, son of Meš-Ane-pada, made the Tummal flourish and brought Ninlil into the Tummal."

— Old Babylonian tablet Tummal Inscription (1900-1600 BC)

== Reign ==
Mesannepada is associated with an expansion of Ur, at least diplomatically. A lapis-lazuli bead in the name of Mesannepada was found in Mari, and formed part of the "Treasure of Ur", made for the dedication of a temple in Mari. Seals from the royal cemetery at Ur have also been found bearing the names of Mesannepada and his predecessors Meskalamdug and Akalamdug, along with Queen Puabi. A seal impression in the name of "Mesannepada, king of Kish" was found in the Royal Cemetery at Ur.

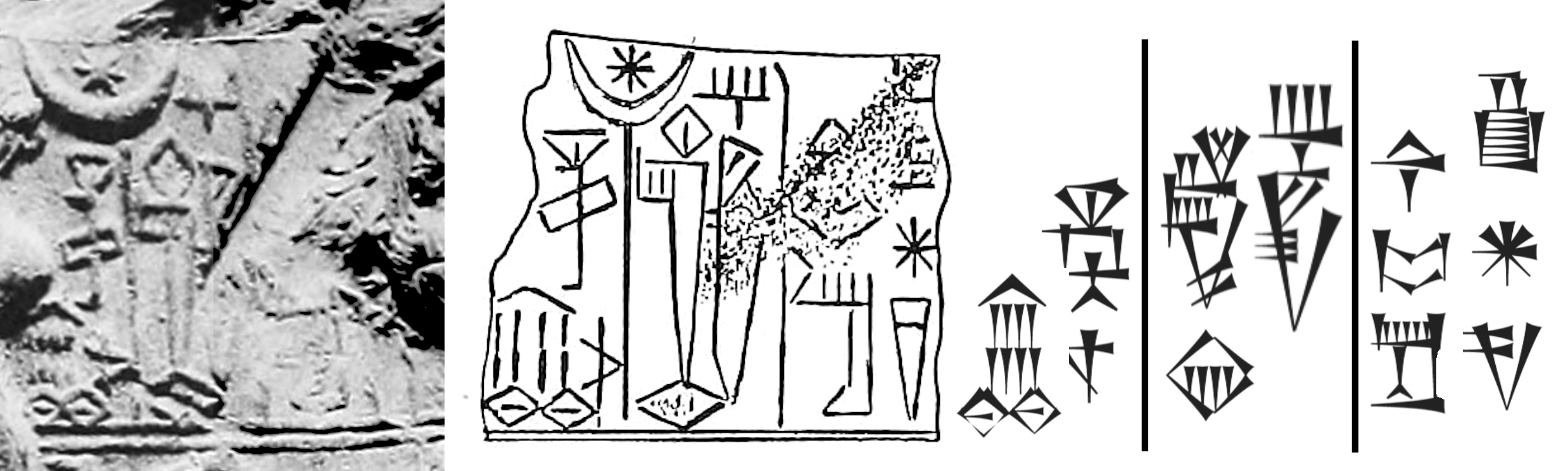
Mesannepada, Lugal Kish-ki (𒈩𒀭𒉌𒅆𒊒𒁕 𒈗 𒆧𒆠), "Mesannepada, King of Kish", on a seal impression found in the Royal Cemetery at Ur. The last column of characters, is thought to mean "his wife..." (𒁮𒉡𒍼, dam-nu-gig). This could also mean "the spouse of Inanna.

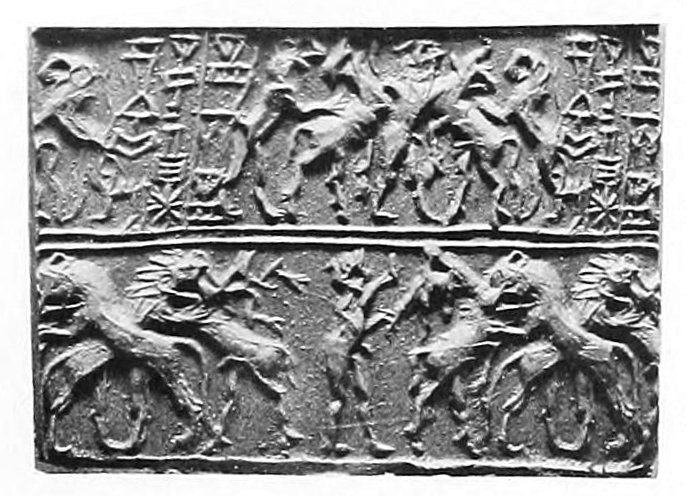
Cylinder seal inscribed "Queen Nintur, wife of Mesannepadda" (Nintur ereš, dam Mesannepada). Royal Cemetery at Ur

Mesannepada, and his son and successor Meskiagnun, who reigned 36 years, are both named on the Tummal Inscription as upkeepers of the main temple in Nippur along with Gilgamesh of Uruk and his son Ur-Nungal, verifying their status as overlords of Sumer. Judging from the inscriptions, Mesannepada then assumed the title "King of Kish", to indicate his hegemony.

Another son of Mesannepada, named Aannepadda, (Aja-ane-pada or A-Anne-pada, "father chosen by An"), whose years of reigned are unknown, is known for having the temple of Ninhursag constructed (at modern Ubaid) near el-Obed, though he is not named on the kinglist.

A small ziggurat beneath the structure built at Ur by Ur-Nammu may date back to the time of Mes-Anne-pada.

In the 1950s, Edmund I. Gordon conjectured that Mesannepada, and an archaeologically attested early "king of Kish", Mesilim, were one and the same, as their names were interchanged in certain proverbs in later Babylonian tablets; however this has not proved conclusive. More recent scholars tend to regard them as distinct, usually placing Mesilim in Kish before Mesannepada.

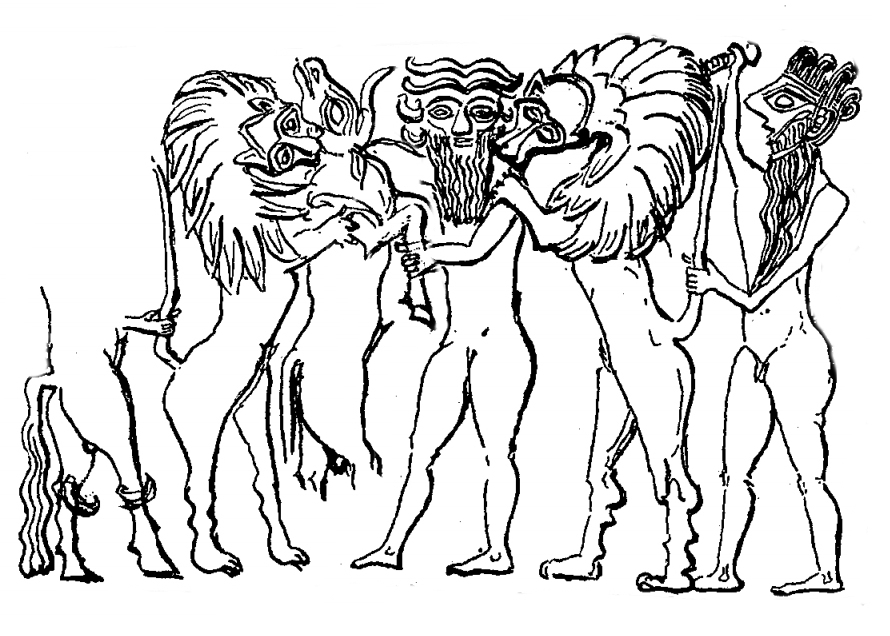
Mesannepada seal (combat scene)

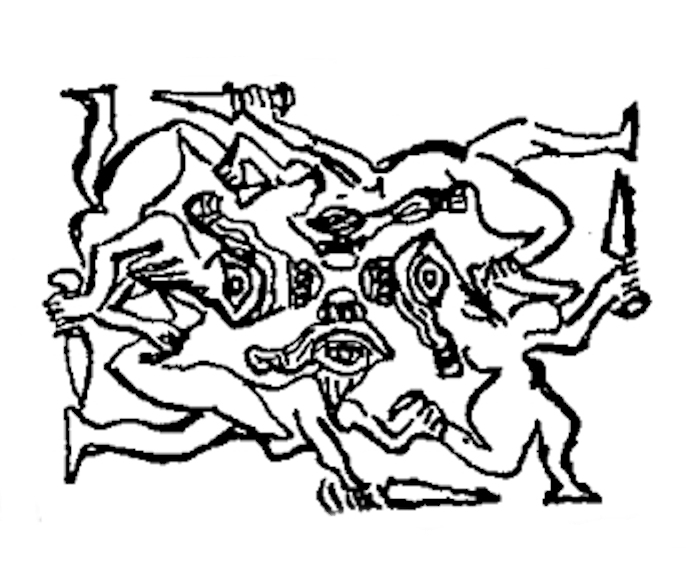
Mesannepada seal (human wheel scene)

== Royal Cemetery of Ur ==
Mesannapeda's tomb may have been located in the Royal Cemetery at Ur. It has been suggested that tomb PG 1232, or PG 1237, nicknamed "the Great Death-Pit," might belong to him.

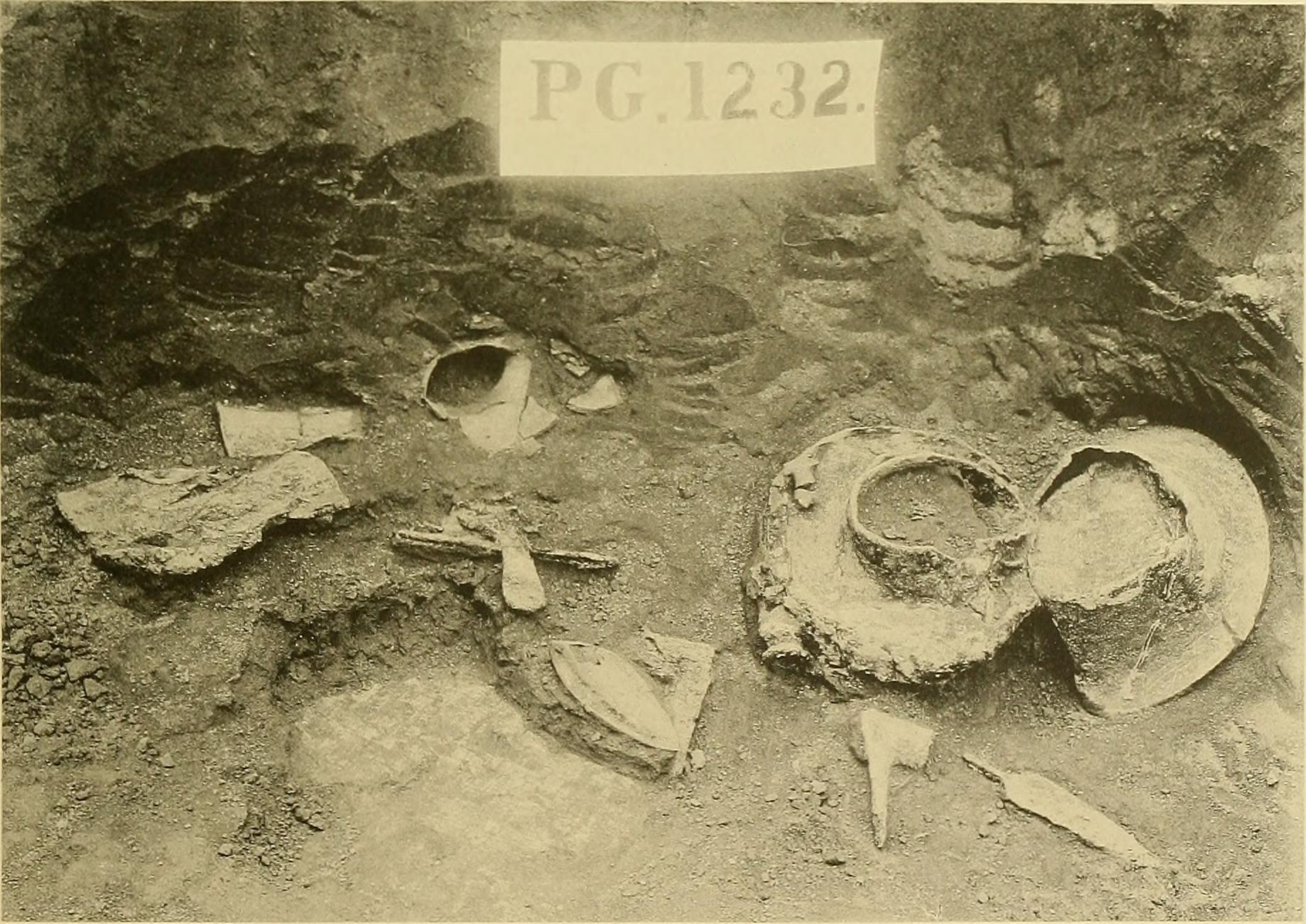
Remains in tomb PG 1232

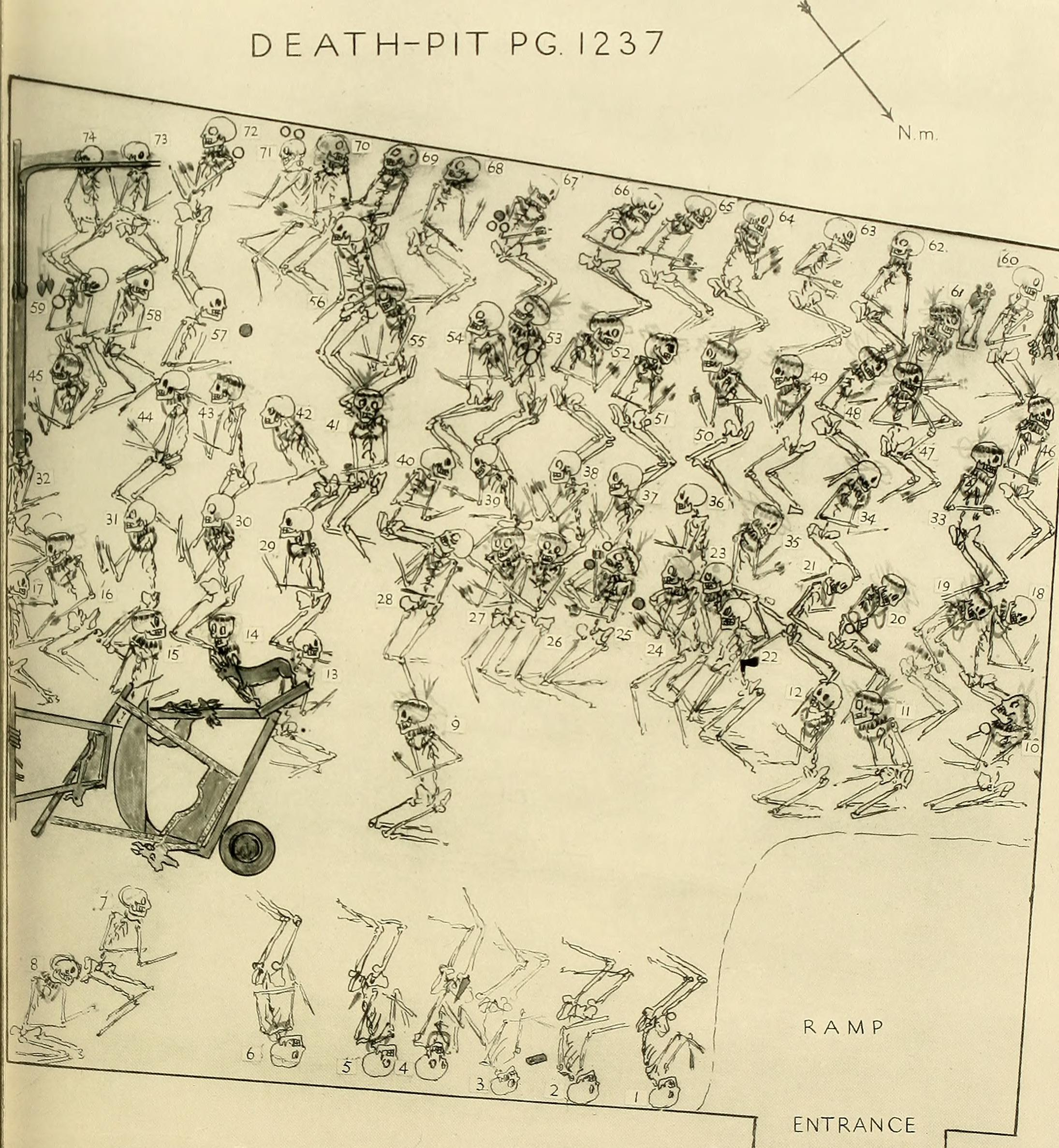
Disposition of royal attendants in tomb PG 1237

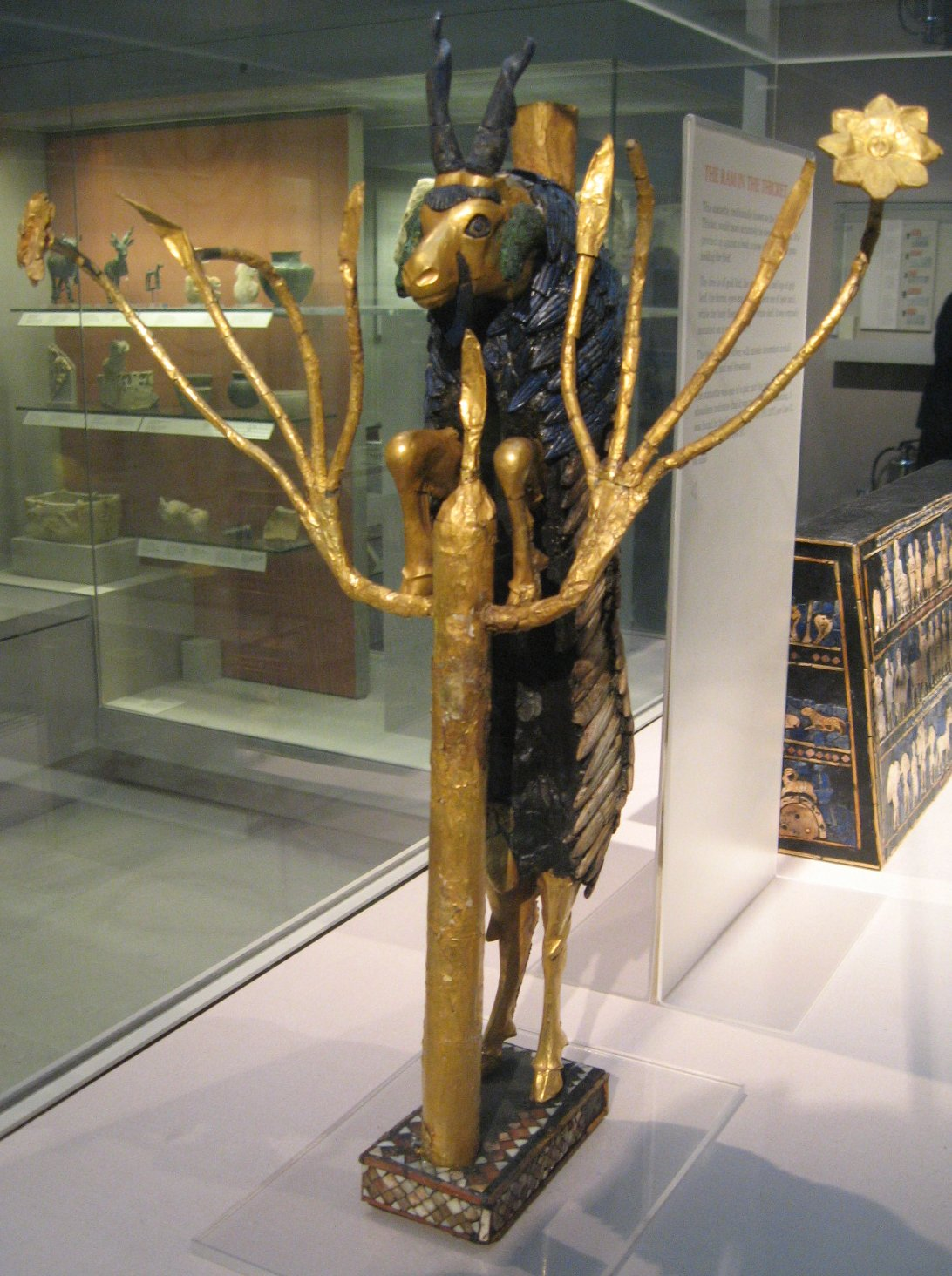
Ram in a Thicket in PG 1237

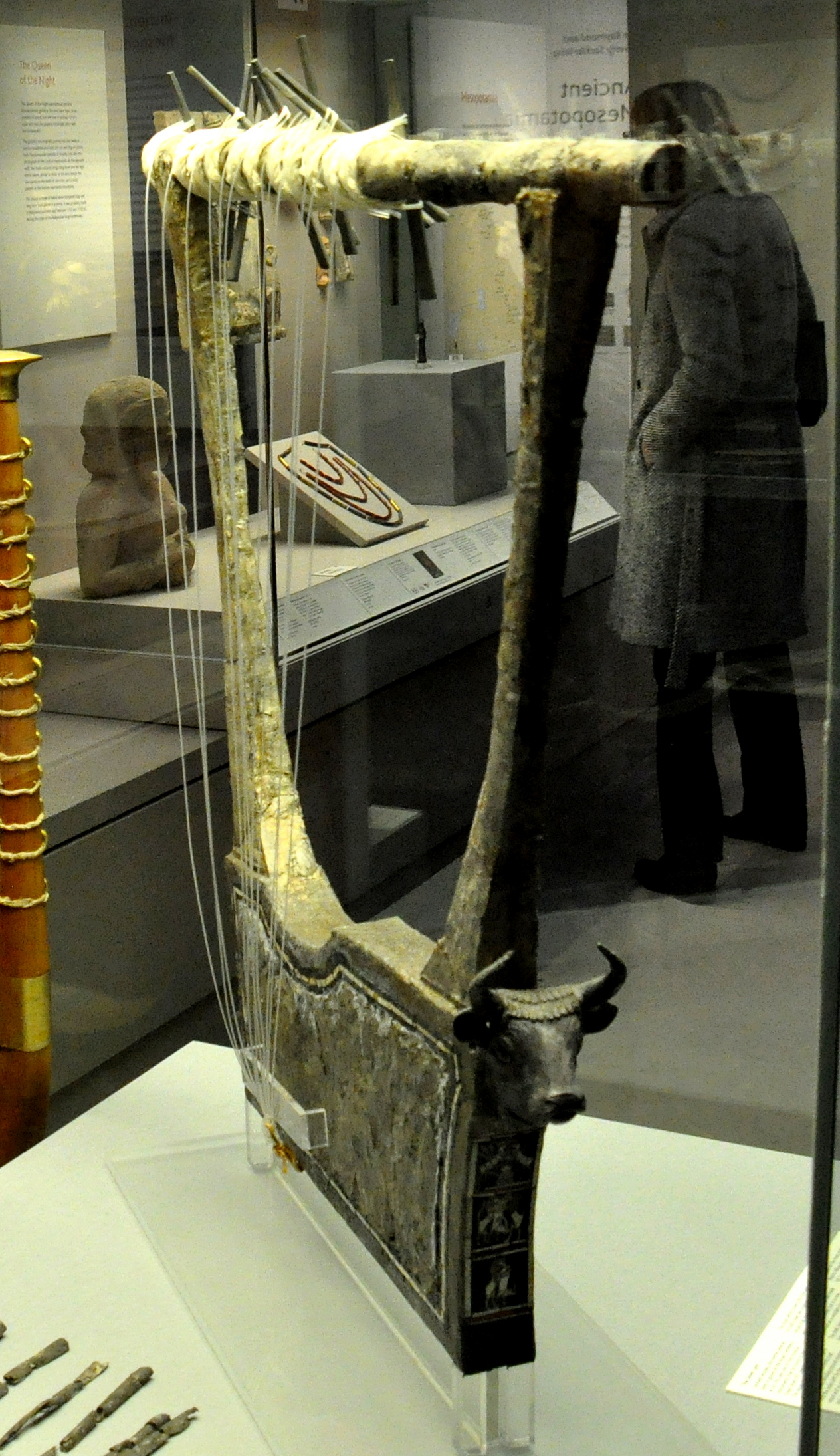
Silver lyre, PG 1237

== See also ==
- History of Sumer

== Bibliography ==
- Finegan, Jack (2015). Light from the Ancient Past: The Archaeological Background of the Hebrew-Christian Religion. Vol. 1. Princeton University Press. p. 652. ISBN 9781400875153.
- Finegan, Jack (2019). Archaeological History Of The Ancient Middle East. Routledge. ISBN 978-0-429-72638-5.
- Katz, Dina (1993). Gilgamesh and Akka. Brill Publishers. p. 55. ISBN 9789072371676.
- Matthews, Donald M. (1997). The Early Glyptic of Tell Brak: Cylinder Seals of Third Millennium Syria. Saint-Paul. p. 311. ISBN 9783525538968.
- Reade, Julian (2003). Art of the First Cities: The Third Millennium B.C. from the Mediterranean to the Indus. Metropolitan Museum of Art. ISBN 978-1-58839-043-1.

Regnal titles
Preceded by Lugal-kitun of Uruk	King of Sumer ca. 26th century BC	Succeeded by Possibly A'annepada
Preceded by Possibly Akalamdug	Ensí of Ur c. 2550 BC – c. 2525 BC	Succeeded by Possibly A'annepada
