= Hammoudi ibn Ibrahim =

Arab archaeological foreman

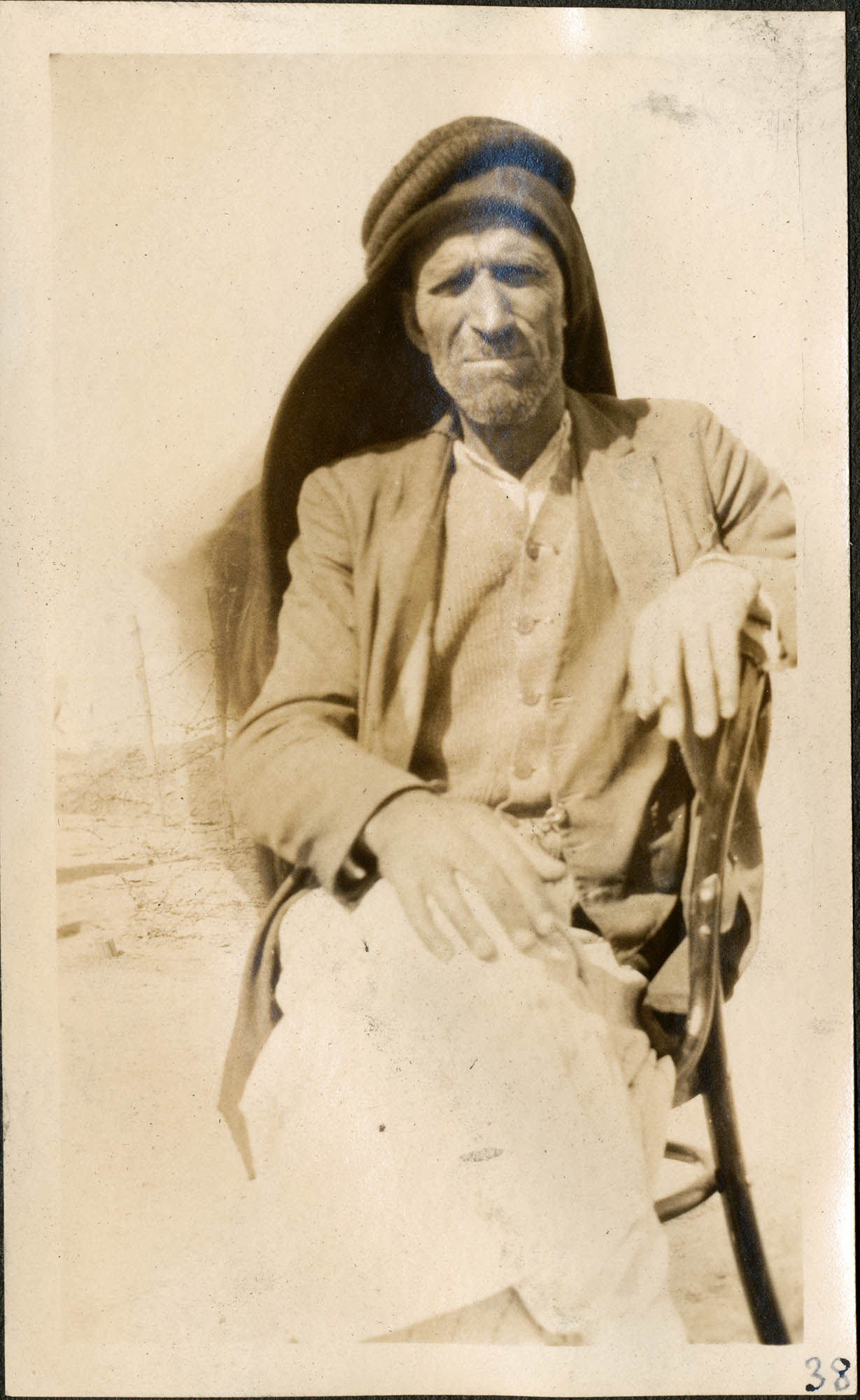
Hammoudi ibn Ibrahim. Photograph by Leon Legrain, c. 1925. Courtesy of the Penn Museum, image no. 244643

Hammoudi ibn Ibrahim (c. 1875–1953), was an Arab archaeological foreman who managed workers at major excavations in the Middle East during the first three decades of the twentieth century. Sheikh Hammoudi, as he was known, came from the northern Syrian town of Jarabulus, located on the western bank of the Euphrates River, just south of the present-day Syrian-Turkish border. He worked closely with noted British archaeologists T. E. Lawrence, Leonard Woolley, Katharine Woolley, and Max Mallowan. Mallowan's wife, Agatha Christie, also participated in excavations and wrote about Hammoudi in her memoirs. Among the sites he managed, coordinating workforces of dozens or even hundreds of local workers, are Carchemish, on the border of Turkey and Syria; Ur, in southern Iraq; Tell Atchana, the site of a Bronze Age city state called Alalakh, in the Hatay province of Turkey; and Chagar Bazar and Tell Brak in Syria. In the 1940s, Sheikh Hammoudi became an elected member of the Syrian Parliament. For his service to British interests during World War II, Hammoudi in 1949 won the King's Medal for Service in the Cause of Freedom (KMS).

== Career ==
According to Leonard Woolley, Hammoudi "learnt his trade" as an Arab archaeological foreman from a man named Gregori, of Cyprus, "a veteran with fifty years of experience in archaeology, who had worked under [Luigi Palma di] Cesnola, Arthur Evans, and [David George] Hogarth.". In addition to organizing workers, Woolley observed, Hammoudi diplomatically managed pro-Arab and pro-Turkish worker factions in 1936 along the contested border between Syria and Turkey over Hatay province.

While working at Carchemish (site of an ancient Hittite capital) from 1912 to 1914, T. E. Lawrence – "Lawrence of Arabia" – contracted typhoid and became very sick. Lawrence later noted that Hammoudi helped him to recover by feeding Lawrence a diet of sour milk. Lawrence credited Hammoudi, more broadly, for teaching him Arabic and introducing him to Arab ways. In June 1913, Lawrence and Leonard Woolley brought Hammoudi to England and they visited Oxford together.

In the early 1930s at Ur, where the British Museum and the University of Pennsylvania led a joint excavation, Hammoudi supervised a workforce of about 300 men. Three sons of Hammoudi Ibrahim, named Yahya, Ibrahim (d. 1932), and Alawi, chronicled these excavations and later became foremen, too. Yahya, in particular, had responsibilities for on-site photography from as early as 1925. Among the scenes that Yahya photographed were skeletons unearthed at the Royal Cemetery of Ur, also known as the "Great Death Pit", which contained about 2,000 burials in addition to that of the queen identified as Puabi. The British Museum retains more than 2,350 glass plate negatives from the site, most taken by Yahya, while the University of Pennsylvania Museum of Archaeology and Anthropology (the Penn Museum) also has prints.

Max Mallowan noted that Katharine Woolley sculpted Hammoudi's head in bronze, and described it as "an impressive and powerful portrait of the man." Mallowan added that sculpture had entered the collection of the Horniman Museum in Dulwich, England.

Photographs of Hammoudi and his son Yahya survive among the papers of the Jesuit priest and epigrapher, Father Leon Legrain, an expert on Sumerian cuneiform, who became curator of the Babylonian tablet collection at the Penn Museum. Max Mallowan also included images of Hammoudi in his memoirs, while confirming, as did Agatha Christie in her memoirs, that Hammoudi socialized with the British archaeologists, eating meals with them and sharing rooms while on excursions.

In 1953, Leonard Woolley dedicated his memoir, called Spadework: Adventures in Archaeology, to "Hamoudi – Mohammed ibn Sheikh Ibrahim, Sheikh of the Damalka tribe – a lifelong helper and friend."
