= Queen Puabi's headdress =

Mesopotamian crown

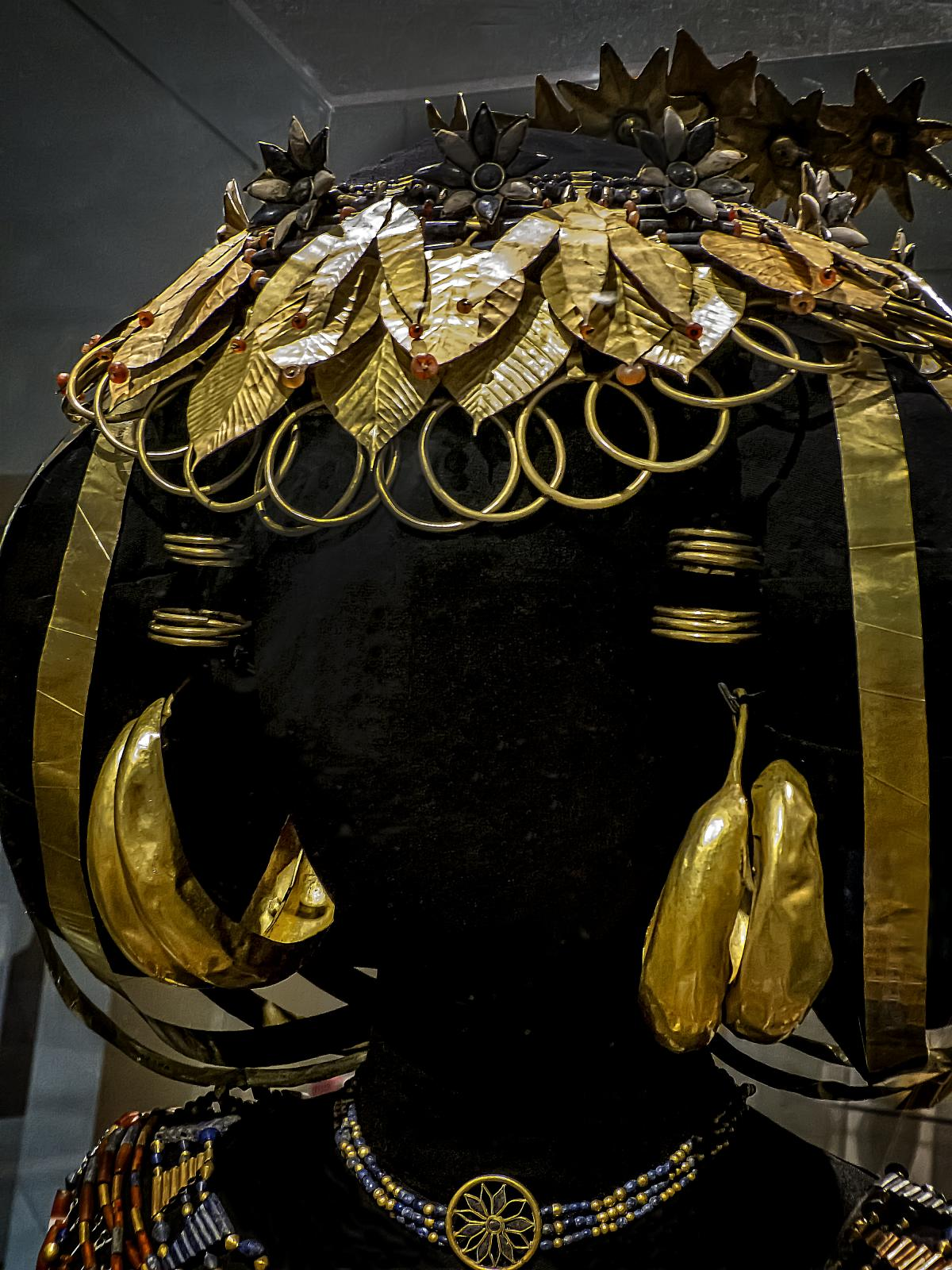
- Material: Gold
- Created: c. 2550 BC
- Discovered: Between 1922-1934; Dhi Qar, Iraq
- Present location: Penn Museum, Pennsylvania, United States

Queen Puabi's headdress is a 2600–2450 BCE Mesopotamian crown consisting of ornate gold leaf wreaths, strands of lapis lazuli and carnelian beads, with a gold comb, and delicate hair ribbons. The entirety of the headdress is estimated to weigh over 6 pounds. The headdress was discovered resting on Queen Puabi's remains in PG 800 during the excavation of the Royal Cemetery at Ur that began in 1922 and concluded in 1934. Successive Mesopotamian societies built new cities on top of previous civilizations and commonly created tells (multilayer man-made mounds) to preserve human remains. These younger tells (built on top of Queen Puabi's grave) hid and protected her immense riches by making them inaccessible to looters. Found next to Queen Puabi's remains was a cylinder (identification) seal with the title "nin" inscribed, indicating a great lady or queen. In the grave, excavators also found the remnants of female attendants – adorned in similar jewelry and hair ribbons – whose purpose was to serve the queen in her afterlife. The religious significance of Queen Puabi's headdress demonstrates her royal status as well as her cultic importance. The unearthing of Ur was led by Charles Woolley and was a joint expedition sponsored by the Penn Museum and the British Museum. The headdress currently resides in the Penn Museum in Philadelphia. The excavation is still very popular because of the riches discovered, the uncovering of a mass grave, and the potential connection with Abraham from the book of Genesis.

== Reconstruction ==
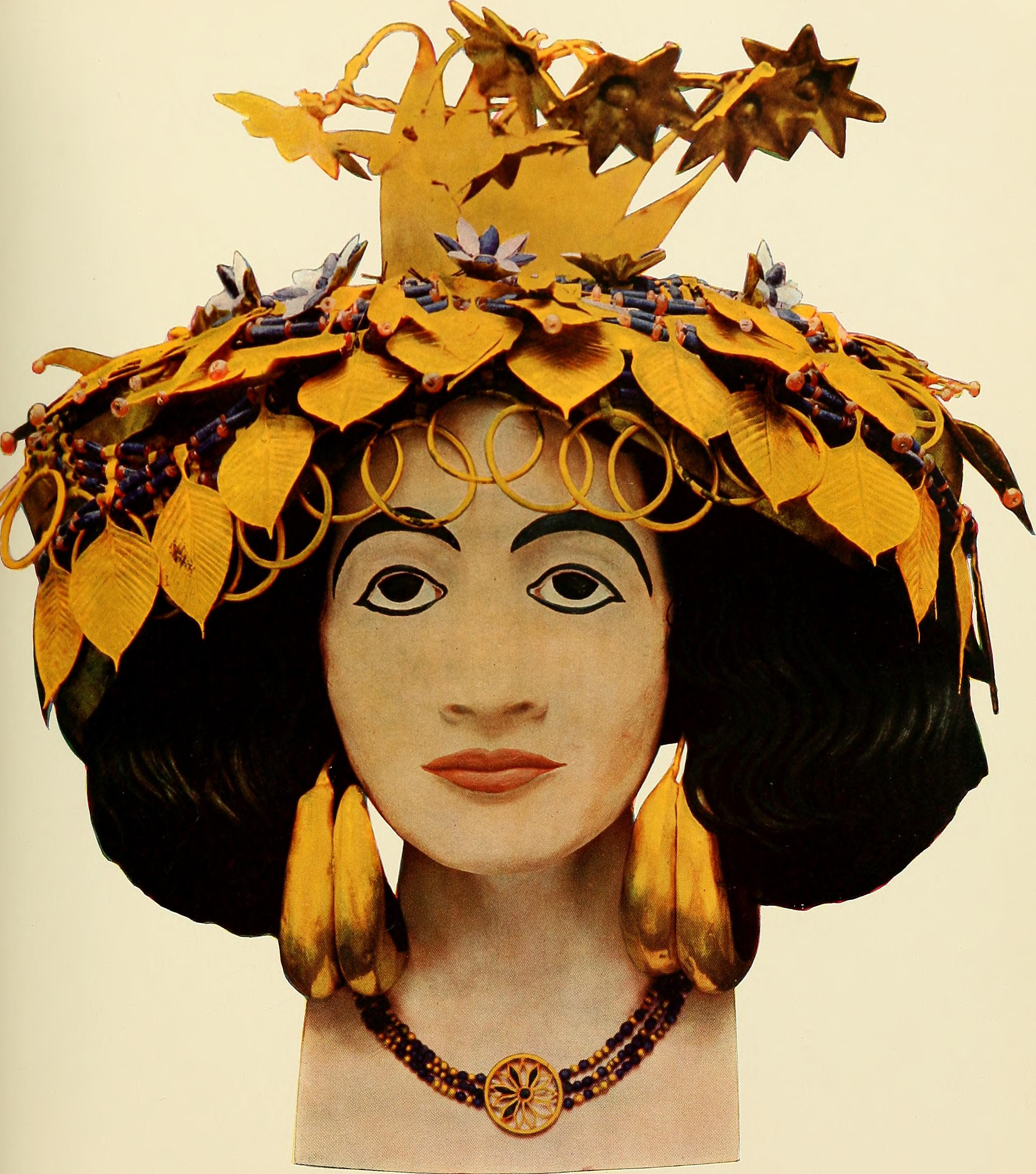
Reconstruction of Queen Puabi

Since the discovery of the imperial graves at Ur, archaeologists and scholars have struggled to create an accurate representation of Queen Puabi. By analyzing the mortuary dress and the material objects in the tomb, scholars concluded that Queen Puabi maintained a high-status. Queen Puabi was roughly 40 years old at the time of her death and five feet tall. The difficulty in re-constructing Queen Puabi's appearance stemmed from the lack of knowledge about female Mesopotamian aesthetics. Although scholars were missing this information, that did not impede Katharine Woolley and one of the Penn Museum's curators, Father Leon Legrain, from giving Queen Puabi a face (and adding make-up). Dr. Legrain modeled his reconstruction of Queen Puabi on the sculpture from Tello (Girsu), “la femme a l’echarpe,” which was created 500 years after her life. The controversial reconstruction was eventually retracted and replaced with a faceless mannequin to avoid the controversial assumptions about Sumerian aesthetics.

== Wreaths ==
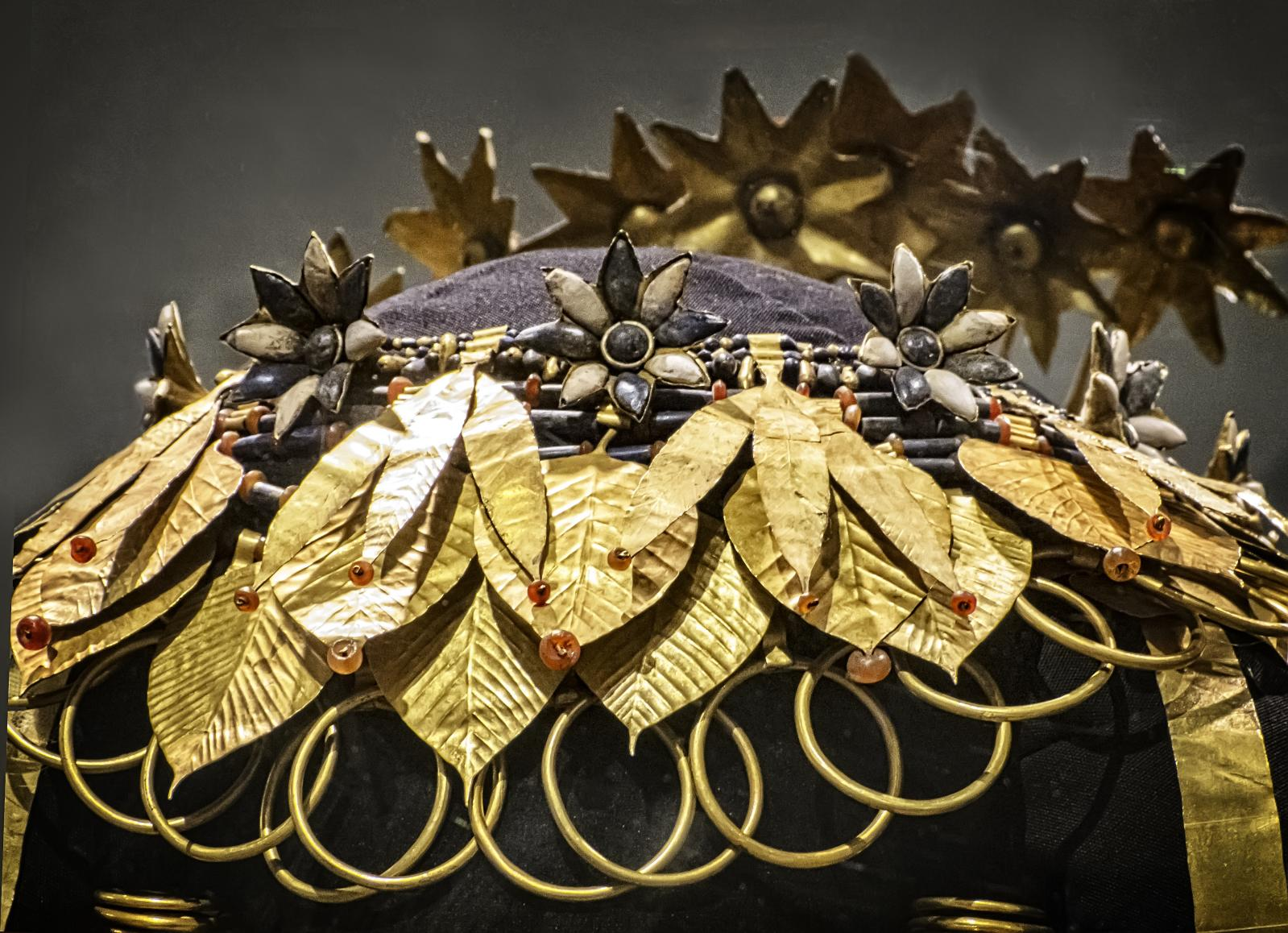
Closeup of the wreaths on Queen Puabi's headdress

Queen Puabi's headgear contains four different wreaths. The first two wreaths are almost identical, with twenty gold poplar leaves separated by two strings of lapis lazuli and carnelian beads. The importation of materials for the headdress demonstrates Ur's political and cultural significance as a hub of maritime and commercial trade. Lapis lazuli is from modern-day Afghanistan, and carnelian is from the Indus Valley, today's India and Pakistan. The leaves are native gold (70–90% pure) and created through a process of annealing and hammering a single sheet of gold. By pounding the sheet in different directions, the craft-smith was able to outline the shape of the leaf and create the leaf's stem that is folded into tubes and connects to the strands of beads. The third wreath differs from the other two because it incorporates white agate, flowers, and willow leaves. In contrast to the poplar wreaths, the goldsmith used different pieces of gold to create the willow leaves (except for the central leaf that joins with the strands of beads). The use of leaves and flowers symbolize abundance in ancient Mesopotamian iconography. Natural themes are present in archaic royal women's clothing across cultures because it alludes to females as fertile and bountiful creatures and promotes their role as the producers of successive generations. In addition to the wreaths, the headpiece also contains a frontlet formed from gold folded over into three strands of beads with twenty gold ring pendants attached.

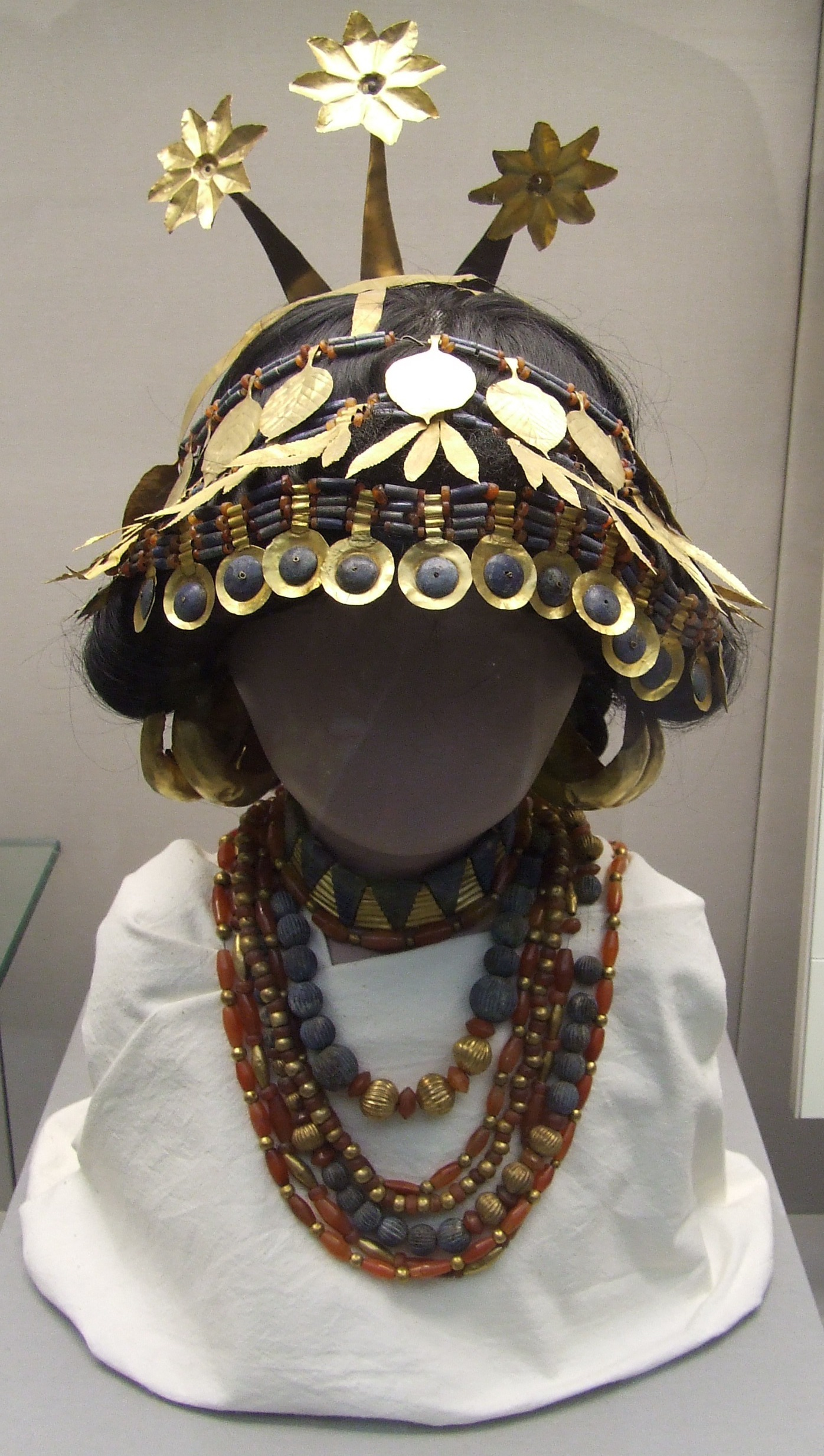
Headdress worn by one of the three attendants found outside of the main tomb chamber (notice the height of the hair comb)

== Hair comb ==
At the top of Queen Puabi's head is a large gold hair comb. The comb itself is sizable at 30.6 cm tall and 27.8 cm wide. It protruded from the back of Queen Puabi's head upwards to create a crown-like appearance. Throughout history, the head symbolized a locus of power where objects that indicate a person's status, occupation, or accomplishments lay. The comb and its seven golden flowers add nearly an entire foot to Queen Puabi's height when wearing it. In the visual representations of different ancient cultures, height was commonly used to indicate rank, proximity to a divine figure, or a gender hierarchy. The correlation between tallness and importance gives insight into why the craftsmen decided to create a high headdress for Queen Puabi's burial. From a single sheet of gold, the thin hairpin extends into the broad base and splays into seven prongs. Intricate gold rosettes are attached to the ends of the prongs. Queen Puabi's adornment in flowers would have made her "...recognizable as a representative of divinely endowed imperial abundance" in the afterlife.

== Hair ribbon ==
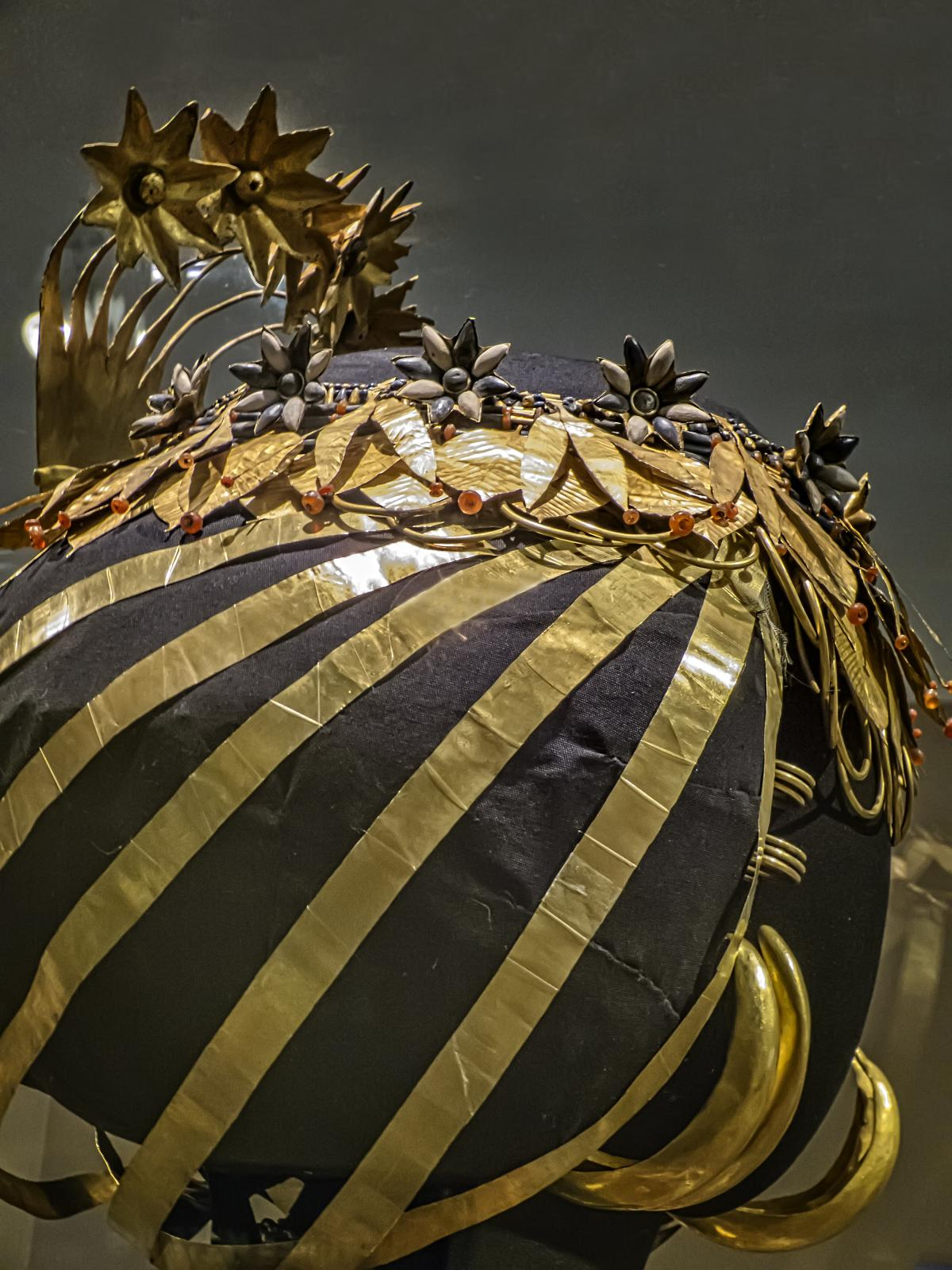
Hair Ribbon (Closeup)

The golden hair ribbons that decorate Queen Puabi's hair (or wig) is arguably one of the most prominent pieces of her headdress. To support the weight of the headdress and comply with the norm of intricate hairstyles during the Early Dynastic period, Queen Puabi most likely wore a wig or hairpiece. The impressive length (some at 36 ft long) and perfect straightness (devoid of human error) add cultic significance to the production of the ribbon. During this period in Mesopotamia, there were simpler processes available to goldsmiths than gold annealing, so the deliberate choice to use that technique suggests the cultic significance of the process. Craftsmanship was the workers offering to the divine, and by using a time-consuming process of repetitive (almost ritualistic) pounding, they were able to achieve perfection and "...hide the hand of the mortal maker." By hammering the gold, it creates a luminosity, which is a central theme in Mesopotamian aesthetics. In fact, the Sumerian term for "shine" is also used to signify "holy" and "pure", which demonstrates the conceptual association between these three ideas. The use of native gold throughout the entirety of the headdress suggests the cultic importance of Queen Puabi and, by extension, her jewelry.

== See also ==
- Enheduanna
