= Puabi =

Queen of Ur

Puabi 𒅤𒀜
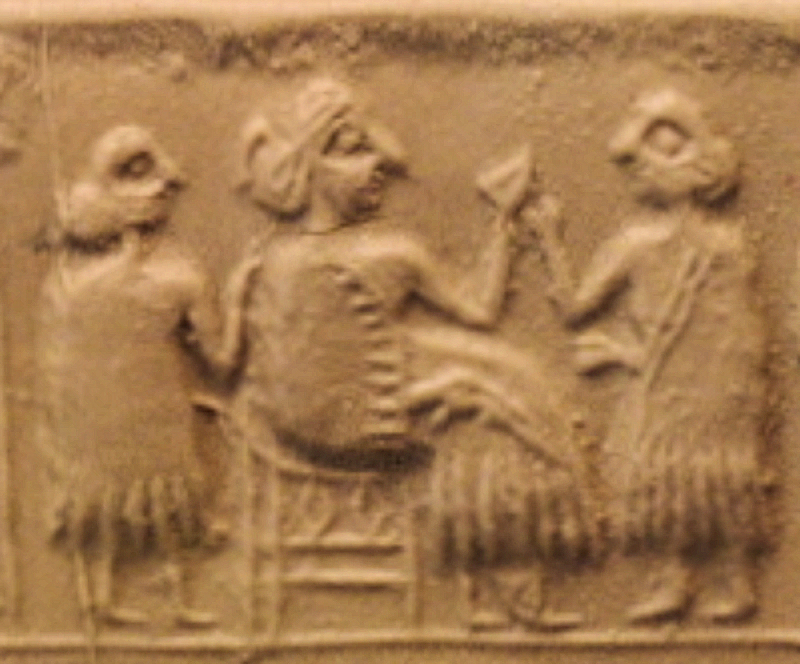
- Queen Puabi seated, with attendants, c. 2550 BC

Queen of Ur
- Reign: c. 2550 BC
- Born: c. 2590 BC
- Died: c. 2550 BC (Aged c. 40)
- Burial: Natural History Museum, England, United Kingdom
- Dynasty: First Dynasty of Ur

Puabi (Akkadian: 𒅤𒀜 pu3-AD; c. 2590 BC - c. 2550 BC), also called Shubad or Shudi-Ad due to a misinterpretation by Leonard Woolley, was an important queen in the Sumerian city of Ur, during the First Dynasty of Ur. Commonly labeled as a "queen", her status is somewhat in dispute, although several cylinder seals in her tomb, labeled grave PG 800 at the Royal Cemetery at Ur, identify her by the title "nin" or "eresh", a Sumerian word denoting a queen or a priestess.

Puabi's seal does not place her in relation to any king or husband, possibly indicating that she ruled in her own right. However, it has also been suggested that she was the second wife of King Meskalamdug. Although little is known about Puabi's life, the discovery of her tomb and its death pit reveals important information as well as raises questions about Mesopotamian society and culture.

The meaning of Puabi's name is uncertain, though it could perhaps mean "word of my father" or "orchard of my father".

== Tomb of Puabi ==
British archaeologist Leonard Woolley discovered the tomb of Puabi, which was excavated between 1922 and 1934 by a joint team sponsored by the British Museum and the University of Pennsylvania Museum of Archaeology and Anthropology. The Woolley team included his wife, Katharine, a fellow archaeologist, who drew the detailed diagrams of the site. Puabi's tomb was found along with approximately 1,800 other graves at the Royal Cemetery at Ur. Puabi's tomb was clearly unique among the other excavations, not only because of the large number of high-quality and well-preserved grave goods, but also because her tomb had been untouched by looters through the millennia.

Location of Ur

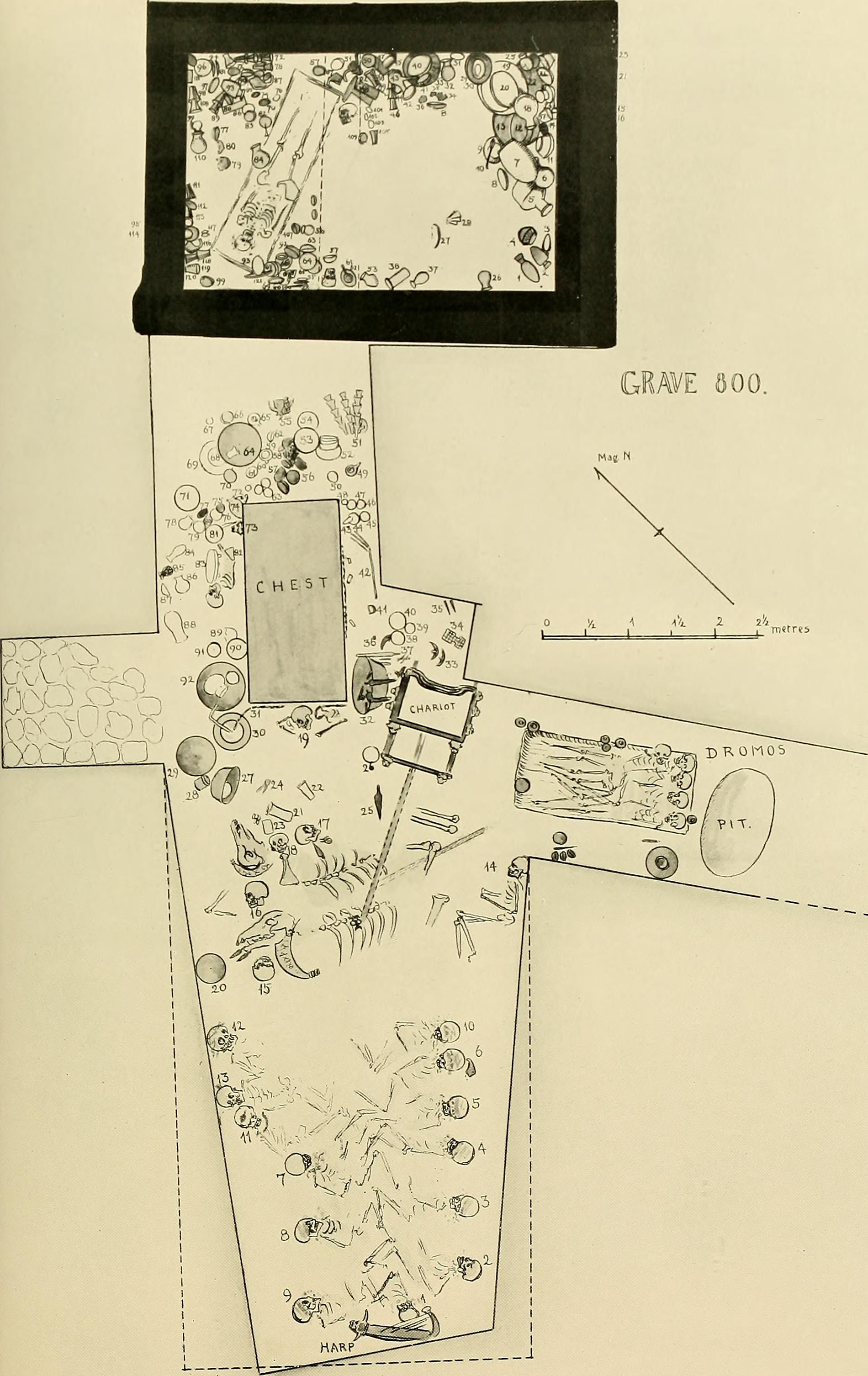
Plan of tomb PG 800, drawn by archaeologist Katharine Woolley

=== Objects in the tomb ===
The number of grave goods that Woolley uncovered in Puabi's tomb was staggering. They included a heavy, golden headdress made of golden leaves, rings and plates; a superb lyre (see Lyres of Ur) complete with a golden and lapis lazuli-encrusted bearded bull's head; a profusion of gold tableware; golden, carnelian, and lapis lazuli cylindrical beads used in extravagant necklaces and belts; a chariot adorned with lioness heads in silver, and an abundance of silver, lapis lazuli, and golden rings and bracelets, as well as her headdress, a belt made of gold rings, carnelian and lapis beads, and other various rings and earrings. Puabi's headdress drew inspiration from nature in its floral motifs and is made up of gold ribbons and leaves, lapis and carnelian beads, and gold flowers.

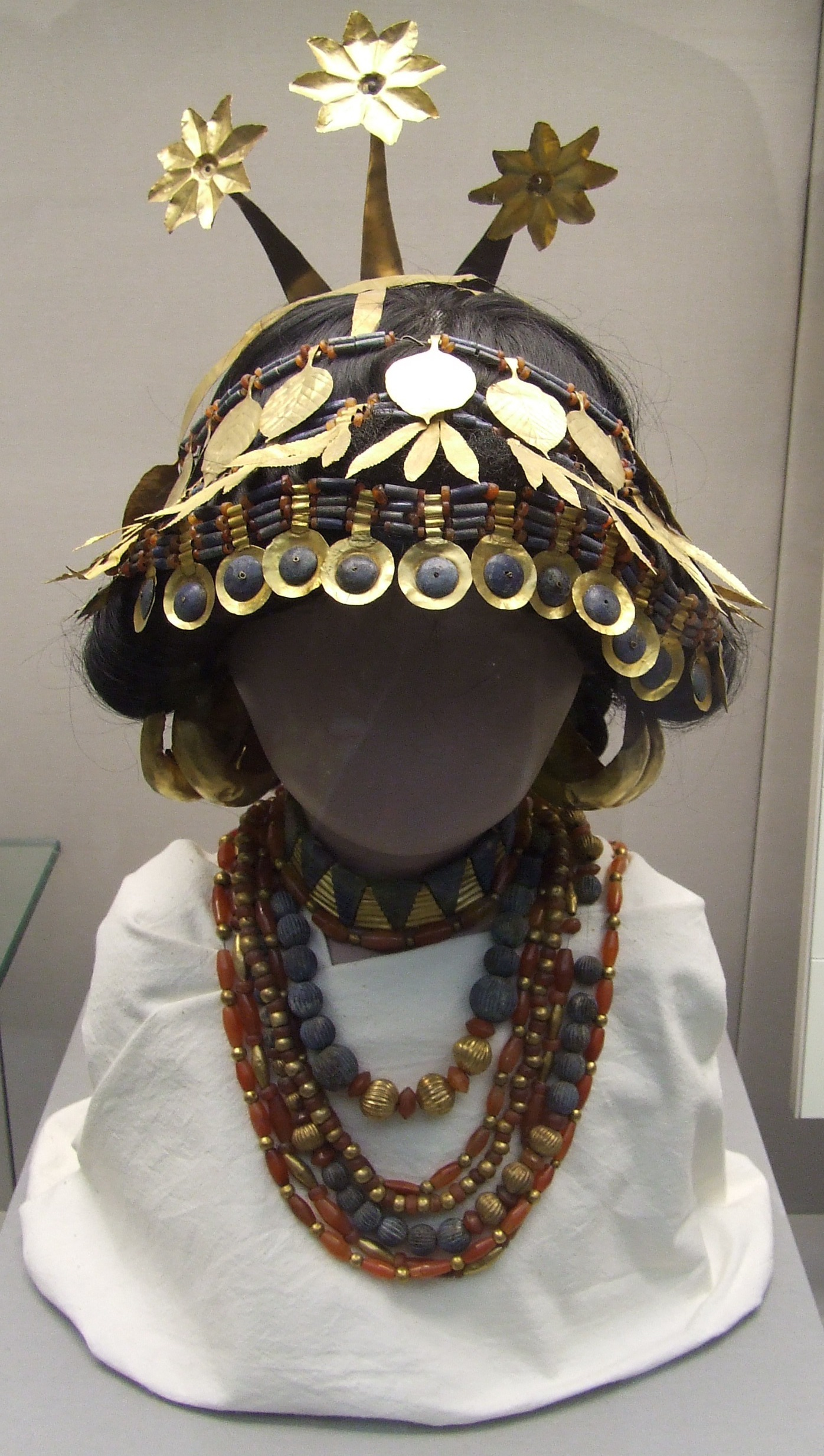
Reconstructed Sumerian headgear necklaces found in the tomb of Puabi on three of her attendants, housed at the British Museum

Due to their age, the textiles in the tomb had disintegrated. Nonetheless, Wooley deduced the pattern of the weaves from the undisturbed remains. The weaves included "plain over-and-under right-angle weave" (i.e., Tabby weave), "finely woven cloth with a diagonal rib", and "a loosely woven right-angle weave fabric on one side of which were long threads forming either a very deep pile or else tassels".

=== The "Death Pit" ===
She was buried with 52 attendants: servants, guards, lions, a horse, a chariot, and several other bodies— retainers who were suspected by excavator Leonard Woolley to have poisoned themselves (or to have been poisoned by others) to serve their mistress in the next world. In Puabi's chamber, the remains of three other women were found, and these personal servants had minor adornments of their own.

A number of "death pits" were also found outside of the chambers as well as above Puabi's chamber. The largest and most well-known death pit held 74 attendants, 6 men and 68 women, all adorned with various gold, silver, and lapis decorations, and one woman who appeared to be more elaborately adorned than the others. The pit found above Puabi's chamber contained 21 attendants, an elaborate harp or lyre, a chariot, and what was left of a large chest of personal grooming items. Due to the location of the pits and general lack of evidence, it is unclear whether the death pits are directly linked to Puabi.

=== Theories of cause of death ===
Evidence derived from CAT scans through the University of Pennsylvania Museum suggests that some of the sacrifices were likely violent and caused by blunt force trauma. A pointed, weighted tool could explain the shatter patterns on the skulls that resulted in death, while a small hammer-like tool was also found, retrieved, and catalogued by Woolley during his original excavation. The size and weight of the tool fit the damage sustained by the two bodies examined by Aubrey Baadsgaard, a PhD candidate at the University of Pennsylvania. Cinnabar, or mercury vapour residue, was observed as well, and it would have been used to prevent or slow the decomposition of the bodies until the completion of the necessary funerary rites.

== Remains ==
Puabi's physical remains, including pieces of her badly damaged skull, are kept in the Natural History Museum, London. The excavated finds from Woolley's expedition were divided among the British Museum in London, the University of Pennsylvania Museum in Philadelphia, and the Iraq Museum in Baghdad. Several pieces of the treasure were looted from the National Museum during the Iraq War in 2003. Several of the more spectacular pieces from Puabi's grave were featured in a highly successful Art and History Museum tour through the United Kingdom and the United States.

== Artifacts from tomb PG 800 ==
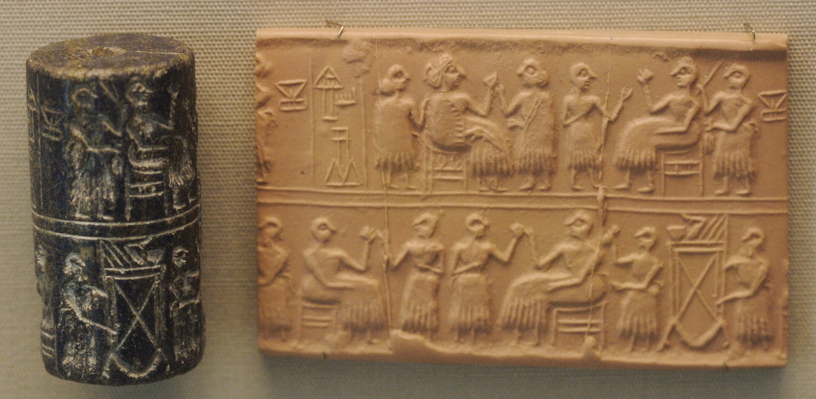
Cylinder seal of Queen Puabi, found in her tomb and inscribed as 𒅤𒀜 𒊩𒌆Pu-abi Nin "Queen Puabi". The last word "𒊩𒌆" may be pronounced as Nin "lady" or Eresh "queen".

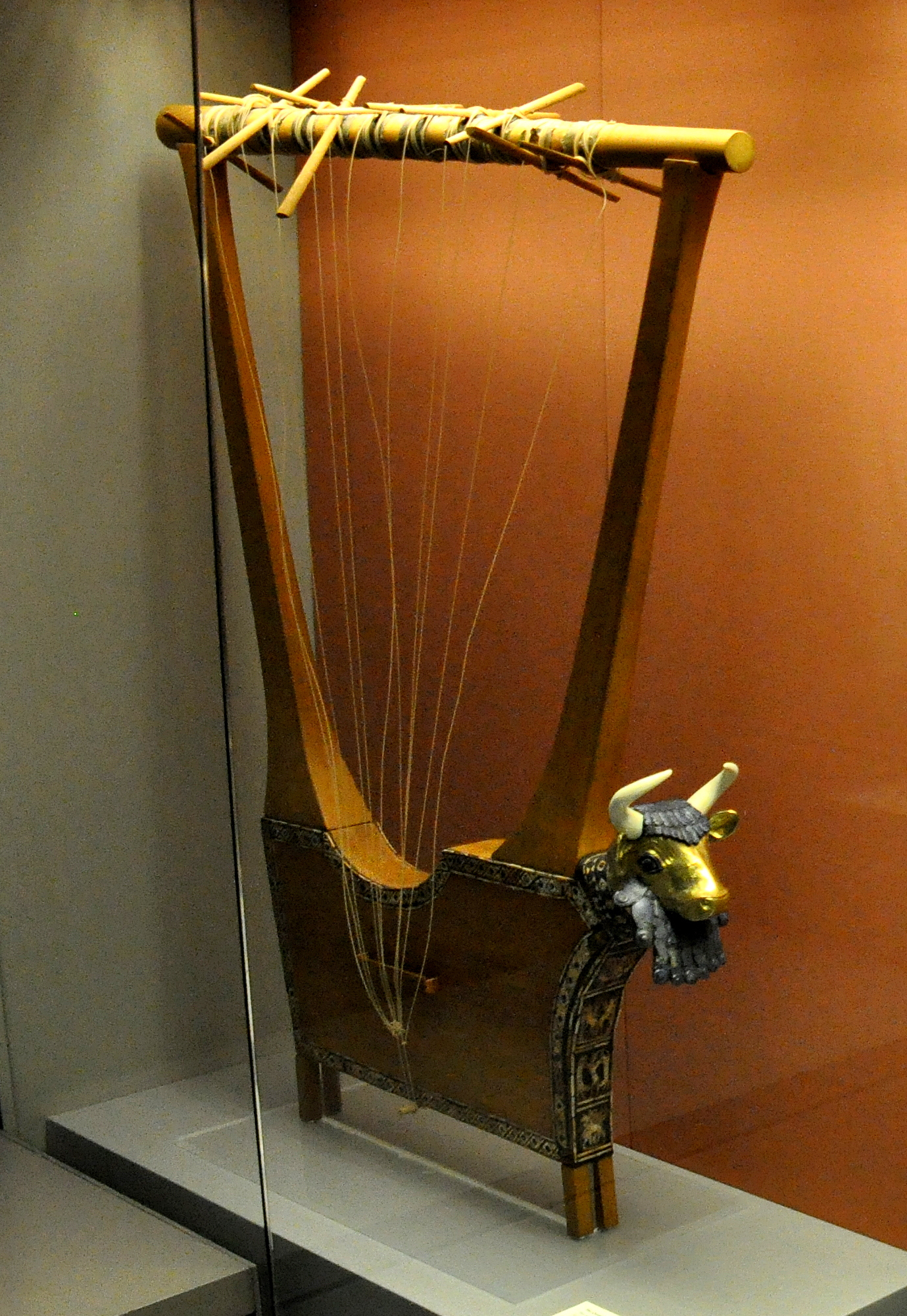
Queen Puabi's Lyre, one of the Lyres of Ur, Ur Royal Cemetery

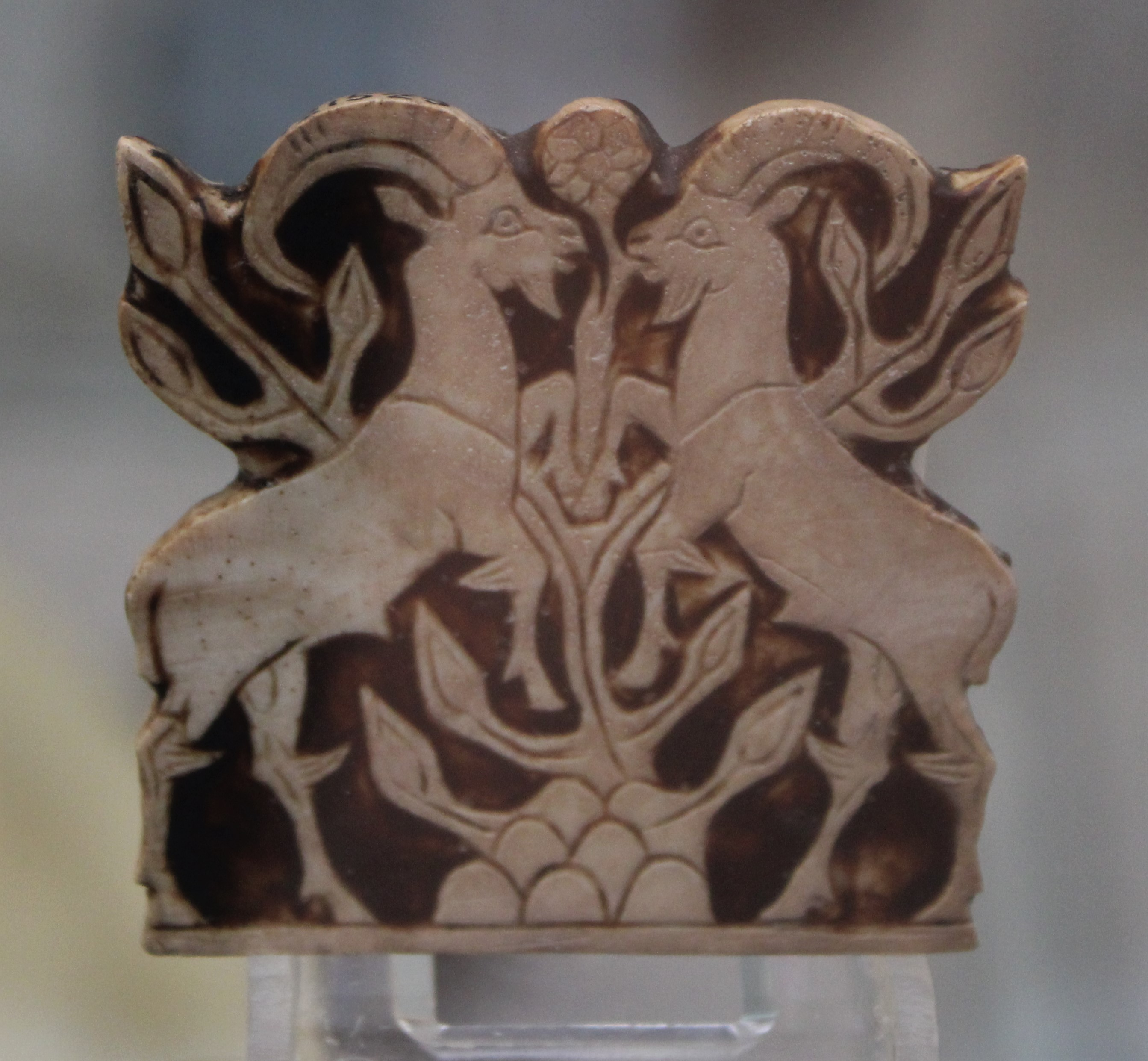
Inlay with two standing goats, Ur, Tomb PG 800

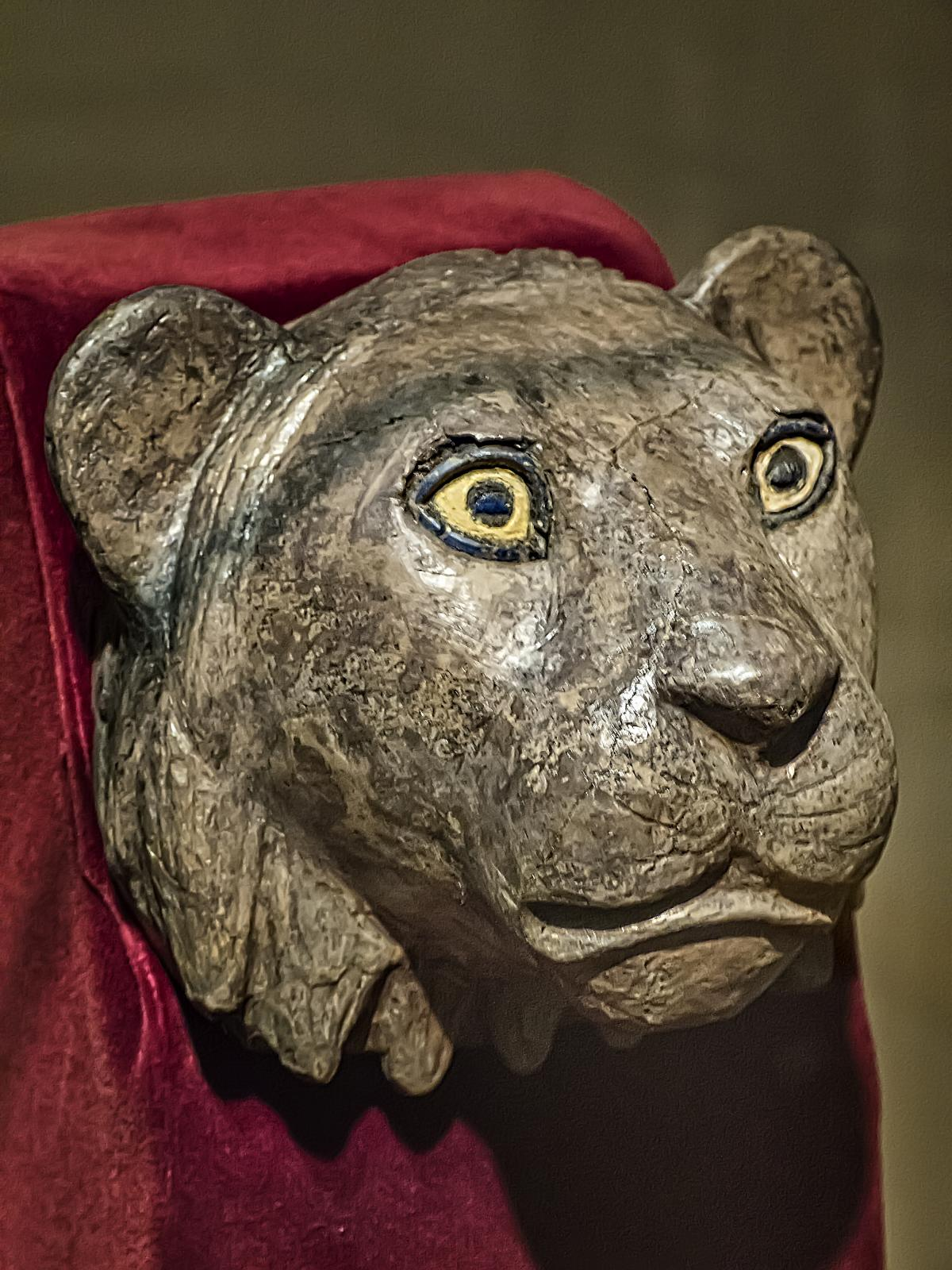
Silver lioness head finial for the arm of a chair with shell and lapis lazuli inset eyes, recovered from the royal cemetery of Ur 2550–2450 BC, from the death pit at the entrance to Puabi's chamber

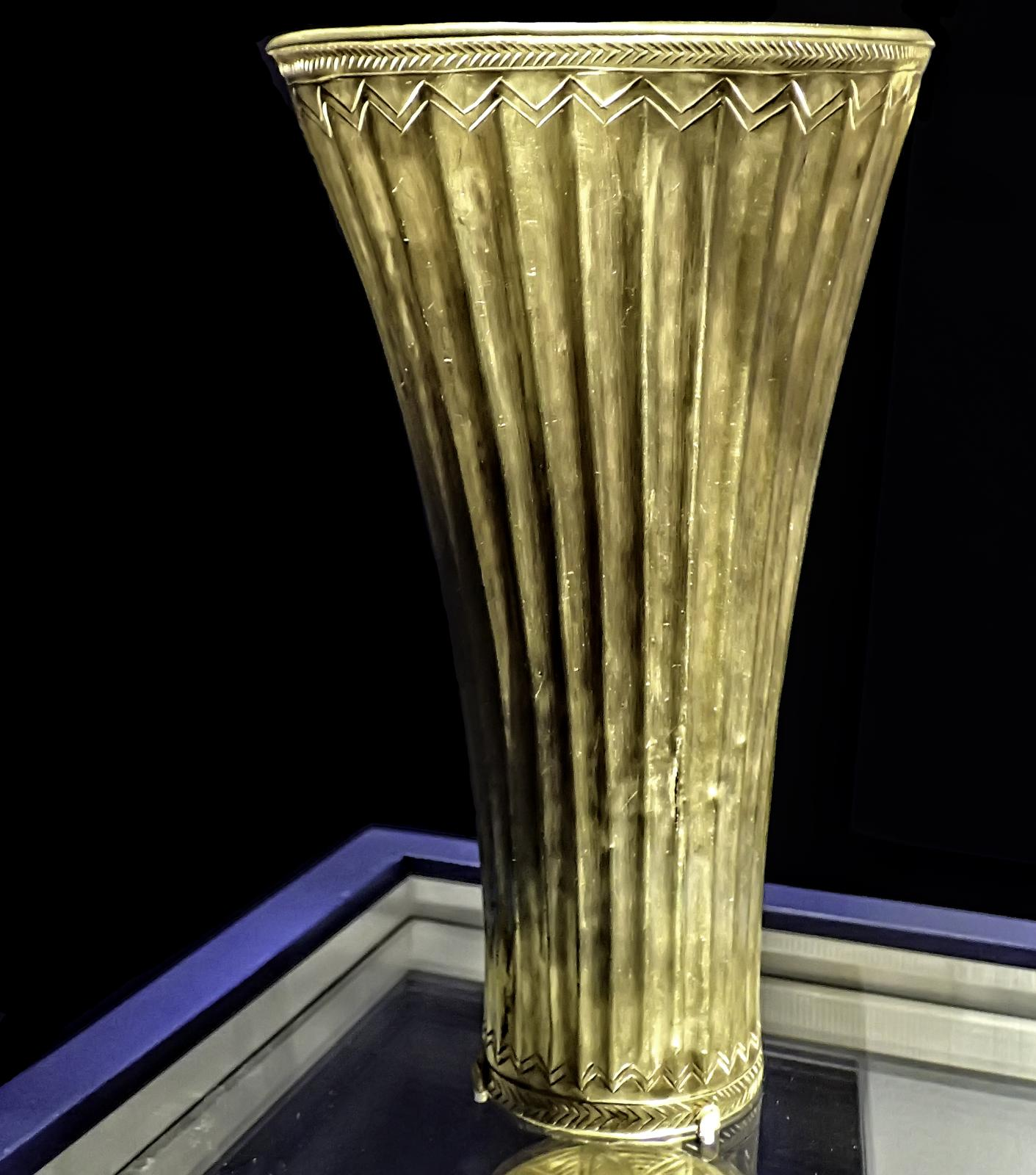
Sumerian fluted goblet from the tomb of Queen Puabi, Electrum, around 2500 BC

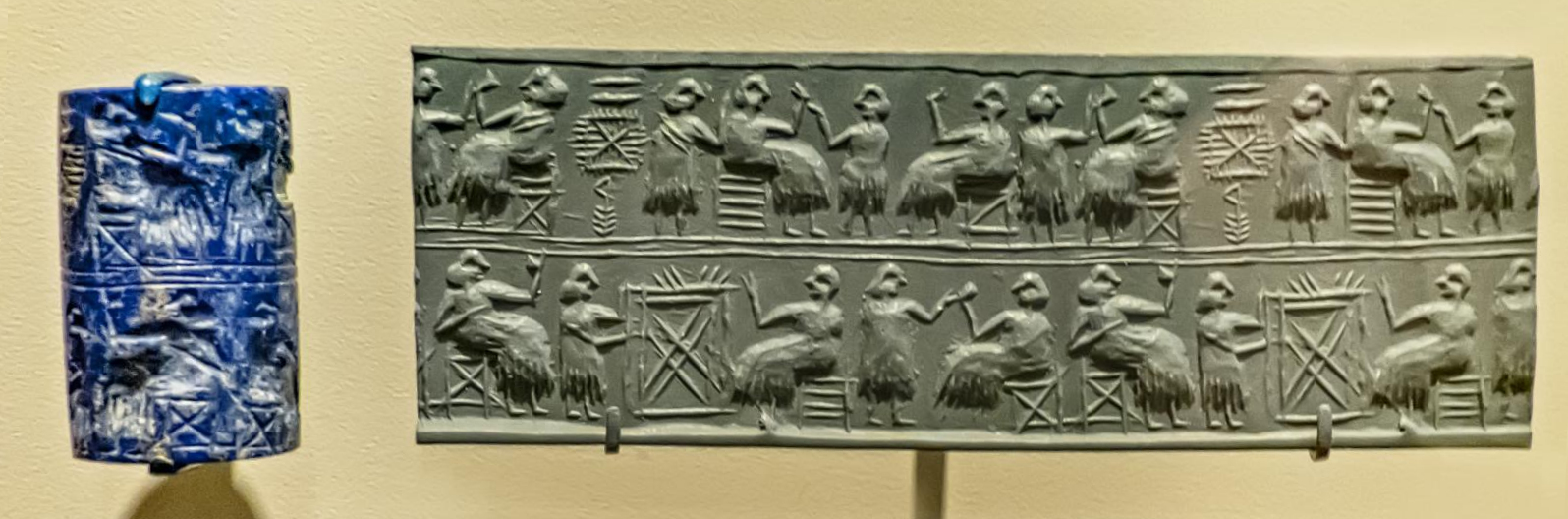
Lapis lazuli cylinder seal recovered from tomb PG 800, inscription U-bara-ge

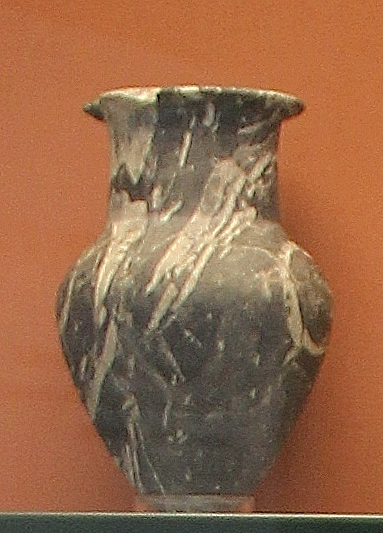
Marble jar, similar to Egyptian jars. May have come from the Eastern Mediterranean. British Museum, BM 121702.

== See also ==
- Early and simple domes

== Bibliography ==
- "Shub-Ad of Ur". Dinner party Database. Brooklyn Museum. 2007-01-29.
- White, Anne Terry (1941). Lost worlds: Adventures in Archaeology. Random House. pp. 300–303.
- Woolley, Sir Leonard (1950). Ur of the Chaldees: a Record of Seven Years of Excavation (Edition: 2 ed.). Penguin Books.
