= Katharine Woolley =

British archaeologist

- Born: Katharine Elizabeth Menke; June 1888; England
- Died: 8 November 1945 (aged 57); Mayfair, London, England
- Occupation: Archaeologist
- Spouses: Bertram Keeling (m. 1919; died 1919) Leonard Woolley (m. 1927)

Katharine Elizabeth, Lady Woolley (née Menke; June 1888 – 8 November 1945) was a British military nurse and archaeologist who worked principally at the Mesopotamian site of Ur. She was married to archaeologist Leonard Woolley.

== Personal life ==
=== Early life ===
Katharine Menke was born in Birmingham, England in June 1888 to German parents. Her father was Carl Menke, a Consul for Germany. She studied Modern History at Somerville College in Oxford, but did not complete her education there due to health problems.

=== First husband: Bertram Keeling ===
On 3 March 1919, she married Lieutenant Colonel Bertram Keeling, the Director-General of the Survey of Egypt and the President of the Cotton Research Board but he committed suicide by gunshot at the foot of the Great Pyramid of Giza on 20 September 1919. The reason for his sudden suicide is unknown. Some have suggested that it was during a temporary fit of insanity due to the discovery that Katharine may have had Androgen insensitivity syndrome and would be unable to have children. Reports mention that after Katharine fell ill one day, the doctor met with Colonel Keeling for 20 minutes, and after this point he committed suicide in the Giza desert. Patients with complete androgen insensitivity syndrome do not have uteruses or menstruate and are thus not able to conceive a child.

=== Second husband: Leonard Woolley ===
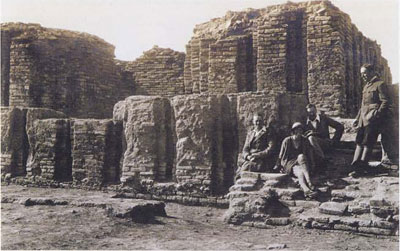
Members of the third season's expedition, 1924–25. Left to right: probably J. Linnell, Katherine Keeling (later Woolley), Leonard Wooley, and Father Leon Legrain, the expedition epigrapher and curator and curator of the Babylonian section at the University of Pennsylvania Museum.

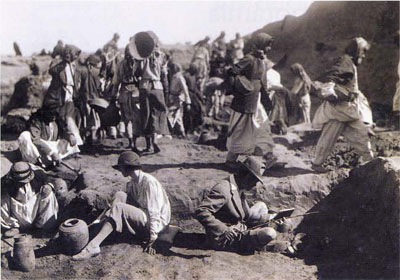
Excavating grave material, 1928–29. In center foreground, Katherine and Leonard Woolley.

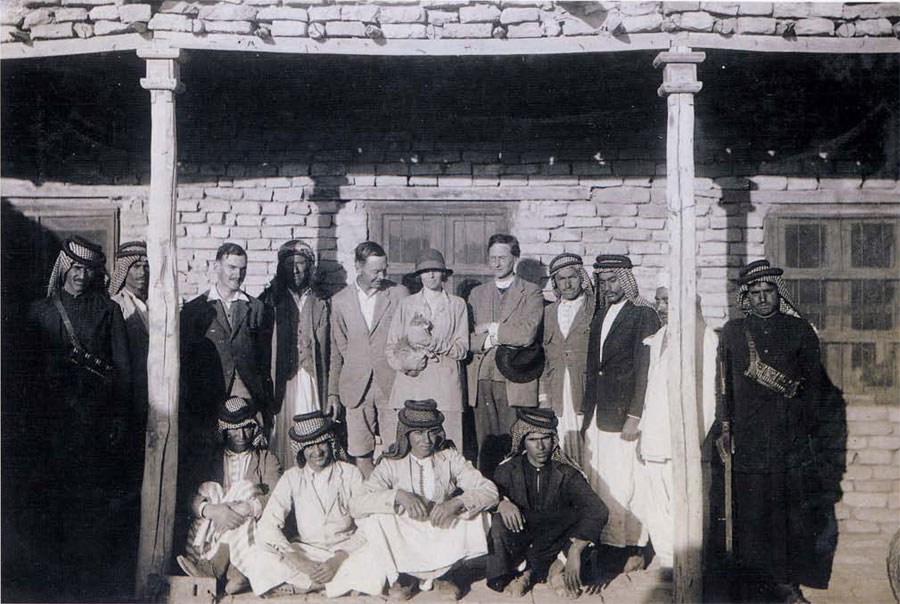
Expedition house and staff, 1928–29. Max Mallowan (third from left), Hamoudi, Leonard Woolley, Katherine Woolley, Father Eric R. Burrows.

She met her second husband, Leonard Woolley working as a field assistant at the archaeological excavations at Ur in 1924. When she first arrived at the site, as a young single woman, the presence of the widowed Mrs.Keeling stirred up controversy among Penn's trustees. Officials at the University of Pennsylvania, particularly George Gordon, the University Museum Director, were concerned that it was inappropriate for a single woman to be living at the site among unmarried men. He noted, "Perhaps the presence of a lone woman with four men in camp makes a more interesting figure for some of them than the outline of ziggurats." To this Woolley responded, "...I do think that the presence of a lady [Katharine] has a good moral effect on the younger fellows in the camp & keeps them up to standard." Nonetheless, under pressure from these financial backers, and in desperate need of Katharine on the excavation, Woolley and Keeling married on 11 April 1927.

Leonard initially had a favourable opinion of his wife, writing to George Gordon. He notes, "Mrs. Keeling was at first very much hurt to think that her name could be so talked about: perhaps that is still the price which women may have to pay for cooperation in scientific work. Of course it's all wrong."

The Woolley marriage was never consummated, as an archived 1928 letter from Leonard Woolley to a legal adviser suggested. The reason is apparently that Katharine accepted marriage only on the condition that the couple never sleep together. Though this situation must have been acceptable to Leonard for some time, in 1929 he sent his attorney a letter requesting divorce papers for Katharine on the grounds of her refusal to consummate the union. The divorce never happened, possibly owing to Katharine's diagnosis of multiple sclerosis.

=== Death ===
She died of multiple sclerosis on 8 November 1945 in The Dorchester, where she and her husband had been living for several years. She had all her personal documents burned upon her death, thereby erasing any first-hand accounts of her experiences. Her obituary on 12 November 1945 in The Times reads,

Katharine Woolley was an archaeologist, like her husband, and shared with him the work of excavation at Ur of the Chaldees, at Al Mina, on the North Syrian coast, and at Atchana (Alalakh), in the Hatay, until the outbreak of war. She was jointly responsible with him for the report published in 1939 on the Archaeological Survey of India. From 1943 onwards, when he was appointed archaeological adviser to the War Office, she was his assistant. In spite of illness, constant pain, and growing weakness, she carried on her work there until two days before her death, which came on November 8. Men and women of many Eastern European countries, refugees after the last war, have reason to remember her sympathy and her vitality. To none will she always be so alive as to the Arab diggers with whom she worked for 15 years.

== Career ==
=== Red Cross ===
She served as British military nurse in the Red Cross during World War I. This position required her to hide her German heritage. Shortly after joining the Red Cross in 1915, she was sent to Egypt to work in a hospital in Alexandria. Afterward, she went to Poland where she worked in a former concentration camp which housed over 7,000 Bolshevik soldiers. She served in Poland until 1919, when she returned to London.

In 1919, Katharine moved back to Cairo after marrying Colonel Keeling. After her husband's sudden death, she remained in Cairo and resumed her work as a nurse.

=== Excavation at Ur ===
In 1924, her work as a nurse brought her to Baghdad, where she stayed with the Director of the Iraq State Railways, Lieutenant Colonel J.R. Tainsch and his wife. Tainsch brought her to visit the dig at Ur, where the Museum of the University of Pennsylvania in partnership with the British Museum, was conducting excavations led by famed British archaeologist, Leonard Woolley. Katharine volunteered as an illustrator for the objects catalogue. The following season, in 1925, Woolley offered Katharine an official position as an illustrator for the excavation. She remained a volunteer until 1926, when she began receiving a salary for her work.

She continued working there until 1934, by which time she was the primary assistant on site. Her drawings of the site were an important contribution and her work was featured in The Illustrated London News, a magazine which publicized important archaeological discoveries of the time. Her drawings were used to publicize the discoveries to donors as well as the public. In addition, she assisted with the reconstruction of various objects exhumed from the site. Most notably, she helped with the restoration of Queen Puabi's headdress. Queen Puabi's headdress was one of the most opulent findings at Ur and has proved crucial to understanding royal life in ancient Mesopotamia. It now resides in the Penn Museum. The famous theory put forth by Leonard Woolley that the massacred attendants at the "Royal Cemetery of Ur" committed mass suicide by poisoning is said to have been a suggestion of Katharine, though death by poisoning has been since debunked.

== Reputation among contemporaries ==
Woolley was described as "demanding", "manipulative" and "dangerous" by those who knew her. Many of the workmen on Ur's excavation were supposedly terrified of her, though her obituary would claim otherwise. The unfavourable opinions of her were perhaps due to her role as an authoritative woman, serving as Ur's excavation leader in its final year in 1931. She was known as a "taskmaster" by those she worked with, with her drive and skills of organization making her extremely competent in a male-dominated discipline.

Supposedly, Leonard Woolley's biographer referred to Katharine as "demanding," "ruthless" and calculating."

=== Gertrude Bell ===
Gertrude Bell was a renowned and highly influential archaeologist in the Middle East. Gertrude is said to have called Katharine "dangerous" and capable of ending a dispute among the workmen by merely showing up.

=== Agatha Christie ===
Woolley was the inspiration for the murder victim Louise Leidner in the novel Murder in Mesopotamia by Agatha Christie, published in 1936. The novel has been described as "a study of the persona of Katharine Woolley." Max Mallowan claimed that "Katharine did not recognize certain traits which might have been taken as applicable to herself, and took no umbrage", though in a 2012 lecture at the British Museum Henrietta McCall said that Katharine was aware Leidner was based on her and apparently enjoyed the notoriety, despite the character's portrayal as difficult.

Christie's second marriage in 1930 was to Max Mallowan, Sir Leonard Woolley's assistant at Ur. In her autobiography, Christie refers to Woolley:

"Katharine Woolley, who was to become one of my great friends in the years to come, was an extraordinary character. People have been divided always between disliking her with a fierce and vengeful hatred, and being entranced by her possibly because she switched from one mood to another so easily that you never knew where you were with her. People would declare that she was impossible, that they would have no more to do with her, that it was insupportable the way she treated you; and then, suddenly, once again they would be fascinated. Of one thing I am quite positive, and that is if one had to choose one woman to be a companion on a desert island, or some place where you would have no one else to entertain you, she would hold your interest as practically no one else could. The things she wanted to talk about were never banal. She stimulated your mind into thinking along some pathway that had not before suggested itself to you. She was capable of rudeness in fact she had an insolent rudeness, when she wanted to, that was unbelievable but if she wished to charm you she would succeed every time."

=== Max Mallowan ===
Archaeologist Sir Max Mallowan initially appeared to have a civil relationship with Katharine. In 1926, Mallowan helped build an extension to the expedition house at Ur to include a women's restroom for her use.

However, Mallowan noted that Katharine "...had the power of entrancing those associated with her when she was in the mood or on the contrary of creating a charged poisonous atmosphere; to live with her was to walk on a tightrope." He likewise referred to her as "poisonous" with a "dominating and powerful personality."

While Agatha (Mallowan's wife) and Katharine were good friends, it is said that their friendship subsided after Mallowan and Agatha married, presumably due to Mallowan's poor opinion of Katharine. But an account by author Henrietta McCall notes that Agatha Christie felt that Mallowan was too close with Katharine, and that he had a liking for her. After Mallowan and Christie were coupled, both were unwelcome at Ur.

Mallowan noted that Katharine Woolley was a talented artist. In bronze, she sculpted the head of the Arab foreman at Ur, Hammoudi ibn Ibrahim. This sculpture later went on display at the Horniman Museum in Forest Hill, south London.

== Publications ==
Although published under her husband's name, she was jointly responsible with him for the publication of the Archaeological Survey of India (link) in 1939.

In 1929 she published a romantic adventure novel, Adventure Calls, set in the contemporary Middle East. The book's central character is a woman who presents as a man in order to live a life of freedom and excitement.

== Other work ==
She and her husband also excavated at Alalakh and Al-Mina.

During World War II, her husband Leonard Woolley worked with Winston Churchill to monitor Nazi looting of museums, galleries and archives; she assisted with this work.

== In popular culture ==
Apart from her connection with the Louise Leidner character in Murder in Mesopotamia, Katharine Woolley (played by Katherine Kingsley) appears as a character in the 2019 TV movie Agatha and the Curse of Ishtar.
