= Ancient art =

Art by advanced cultures of ancient societies

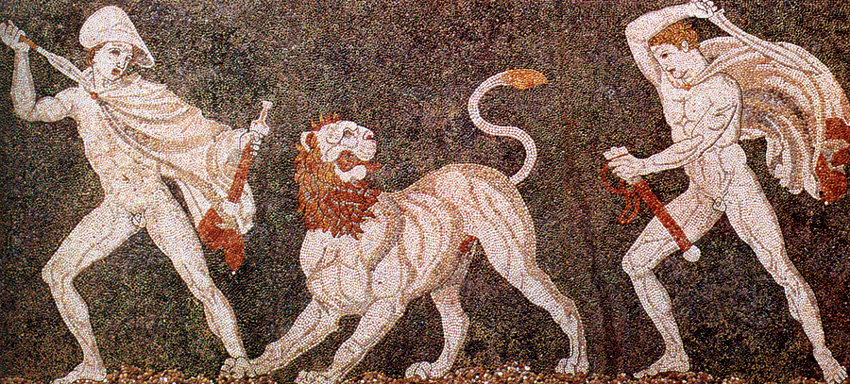
- Greek mosaic at the Archaeological Museum of Pella depicting Alexander the Great (left; identified by his kausia) and his friend Craterus fighting an Asiatic lion, late 4th century BC
- Years active: Antiquity

Ancient art refers to the many types of art produced by the advanced cultures of ancient societies with different forms of writing, such as those of China, India, Mesopotamia, Persia, Egypt, Greece, and Rome. The art of pre-literate societies is normally referred to as prehistoric art and is not covered by the scope of the ancient era. Furthermore, although some pre-Columbian cultures developed writing in the centuries preceding the European discovery of the Americas, these advancements are, on grounds of dating, largely covered with the dedicated topic of pre-Columbian art and associated sub-topics, such as Maya art, Aztec art, and Olmec art.

== West Asia and Mediterranean ==
=== Arabian ===
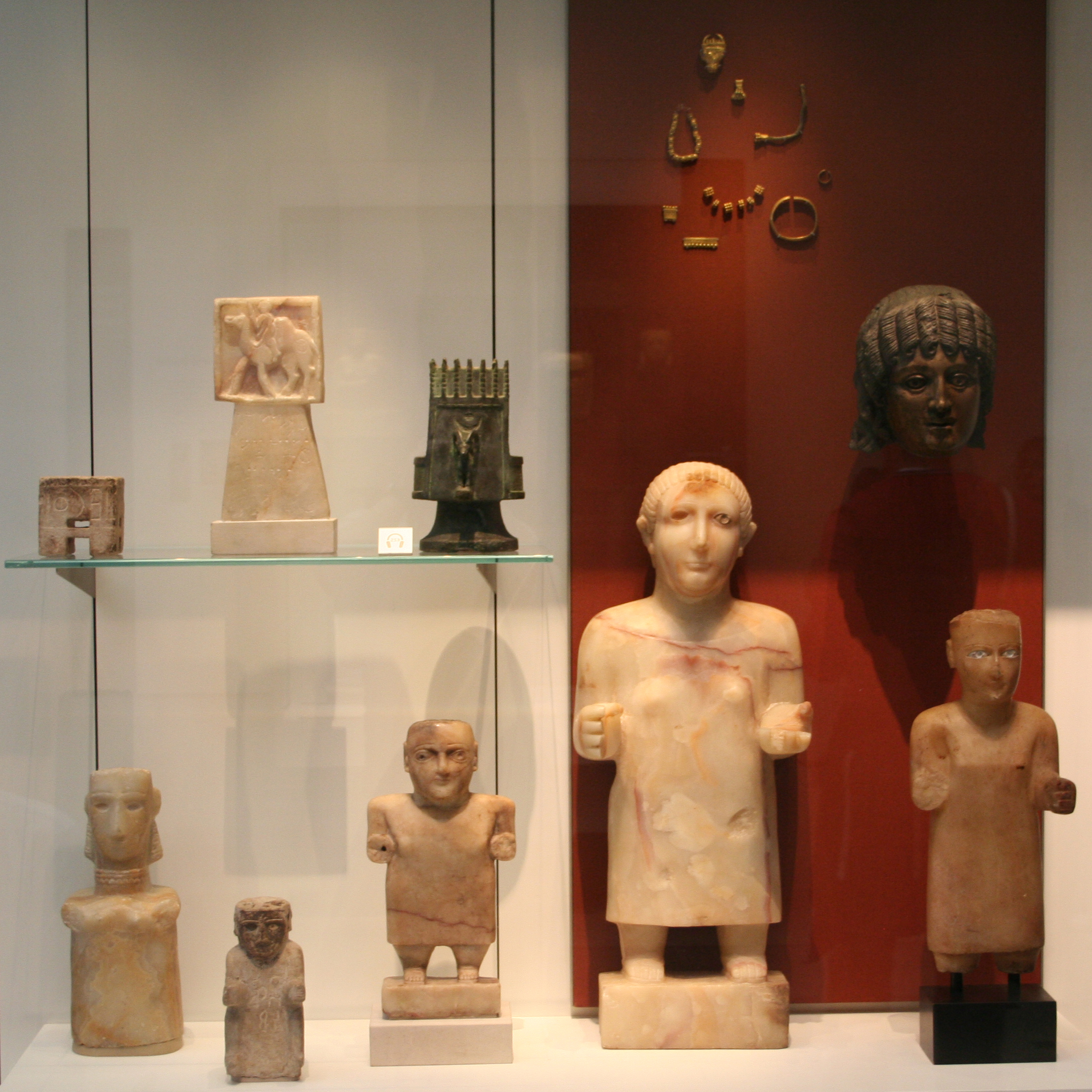
Pre-Islamic Arabian art in the British Museum (London)

The art of Pre-Islamic Arabia is related to that of neighbouring cultures. Pre-Islamic Yemen produced stylized alabaster heads of great aesthetic and historic charm. Most of the pre-Islamic sculptures are made of alabaster.

Archaeology has revealed some early settled civilizations in Saudi Arabia: the Dilmun civilization on the east of the Arabian Peninsula, Thamud north of the Hejaz, and Kinda and Al-Magar civilization in the central of Arabian Peninsula. The earliest known events in Arabian history are migrations from the peninsula into neighbouring areas. In antiquity, the role of South Arabian societies such as Saba (Sheba) in the production and trade of aromatics not only brought such kingdoms wealth but also tied the Arabian Peninsula into trade networks, resulting in far-ranging artistic influences.

It seems probable that before around 4000 BC the Arabian climate was somewhat wetter that today, benefitting from a monsoon system that has since moved south. During the late fourth millennium BC permanent settlements began to appear, and inhabitants adjusted to the emerging dryer conditions. In southwestern Arabia (modern Yemen) a moister climate supported several kingdoms during the second and first millennia BC. The most famous of these is Sheba, the kingdom of the biblical Queen of Sheba. These societies used a combination of trade in spices and the natural resources of the region, including aromatics such as frankincense and myrrh, to build wealthy kingdoms. Mārib, the Sabaean capital, was well positioned to tap into Mediterranean as well as Near Eastern trade, and in kingdoms to the east, in what is today Oman, trading links with Mesopotamia, Persia, and even India were possible. The area was never a part of the Assyrian or Persian empires, and even Babylonian control of north-west Arabia seems to have been relatively short-lived. Later Roman attempts to control the region's lucrative trade were foundered. This impenetrability to foreign armies doubtless augmented ancient rulers' bargaining power in the spice and incense trade.

Although subject to external influences, south Arabia retained characteristics particular to itself. The human figure is typically based on strong, square shapes, the fine modeling of detail contrasting with a stylized simplicity of form.

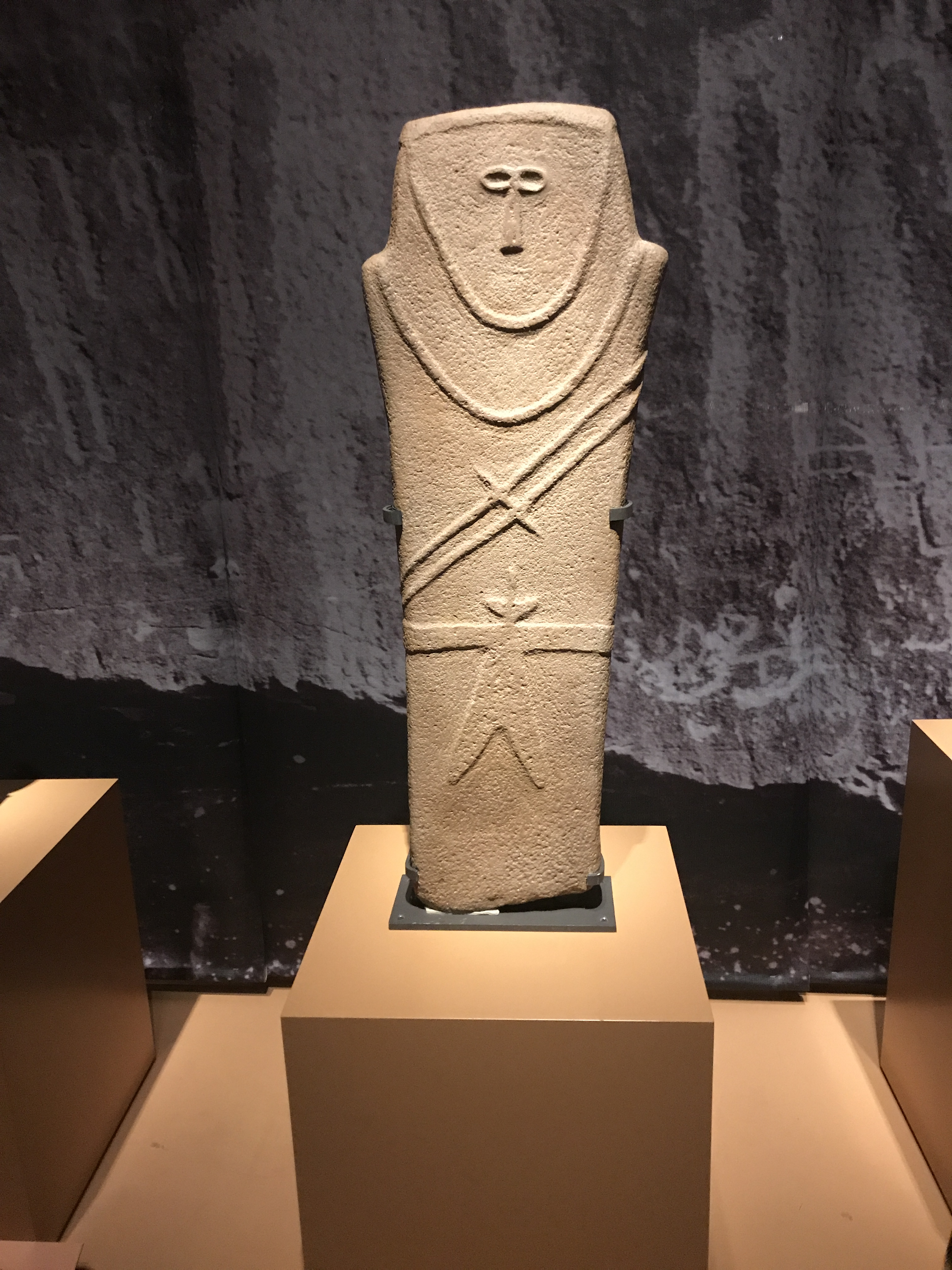
Stele of a male wearing a baldric; 4th millennium BC; sandstone; height: 92 cm; from Al-'Ula (Saudi Arabia); in a temporary exhibition in the National Museum of Korea (Seoul), named Roads of Arabia: Archaeological Treasures of Saudi Arabia

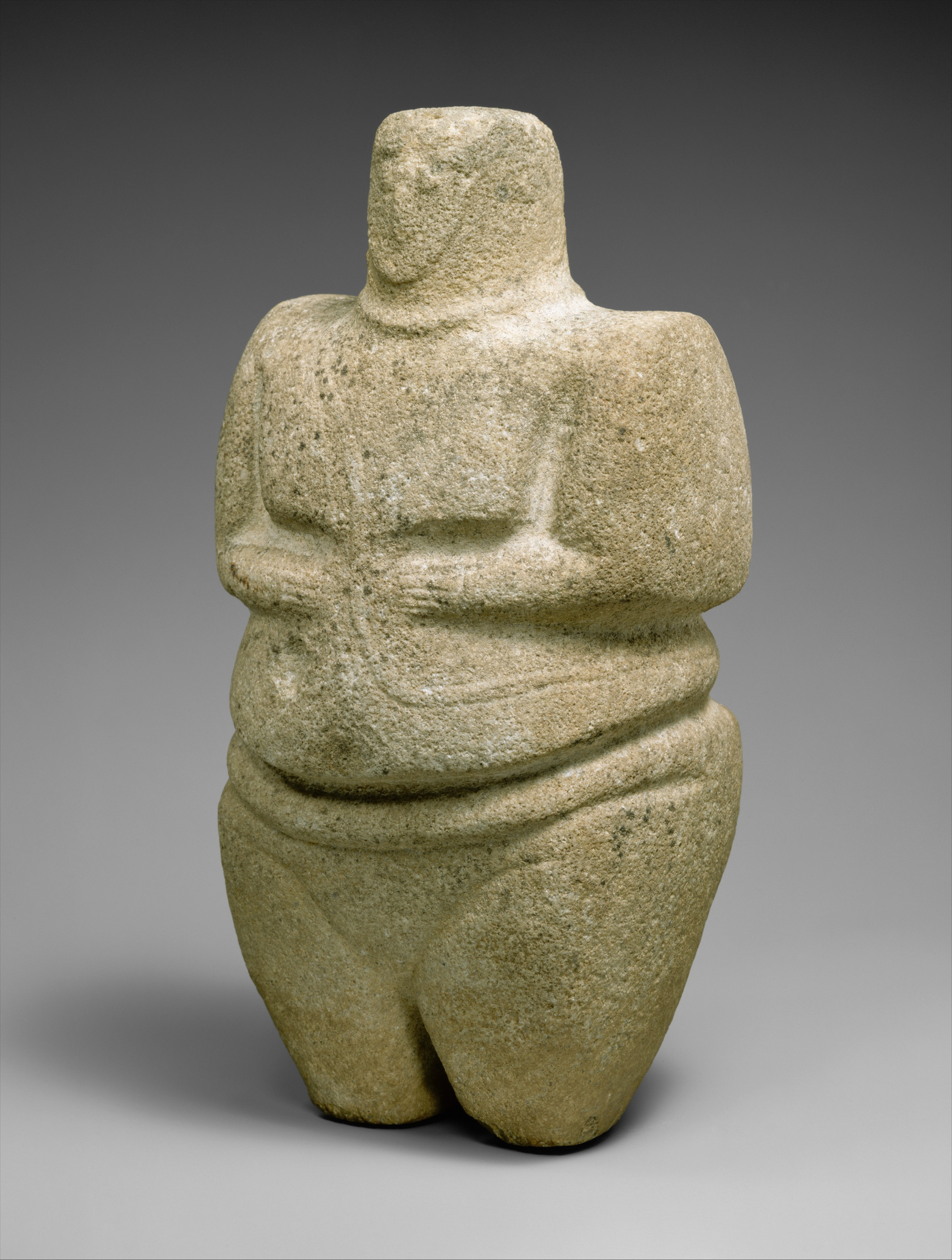
Standing female figure wearing a strap and a necklace; 3rd–2nd millennium BC; sandstone and quartzite; height: 27.5 cm, width: 14.3 cm, depth: 14.3 cm; from Mareb (Yemen); Metropolitan Museum of Art (New York City)

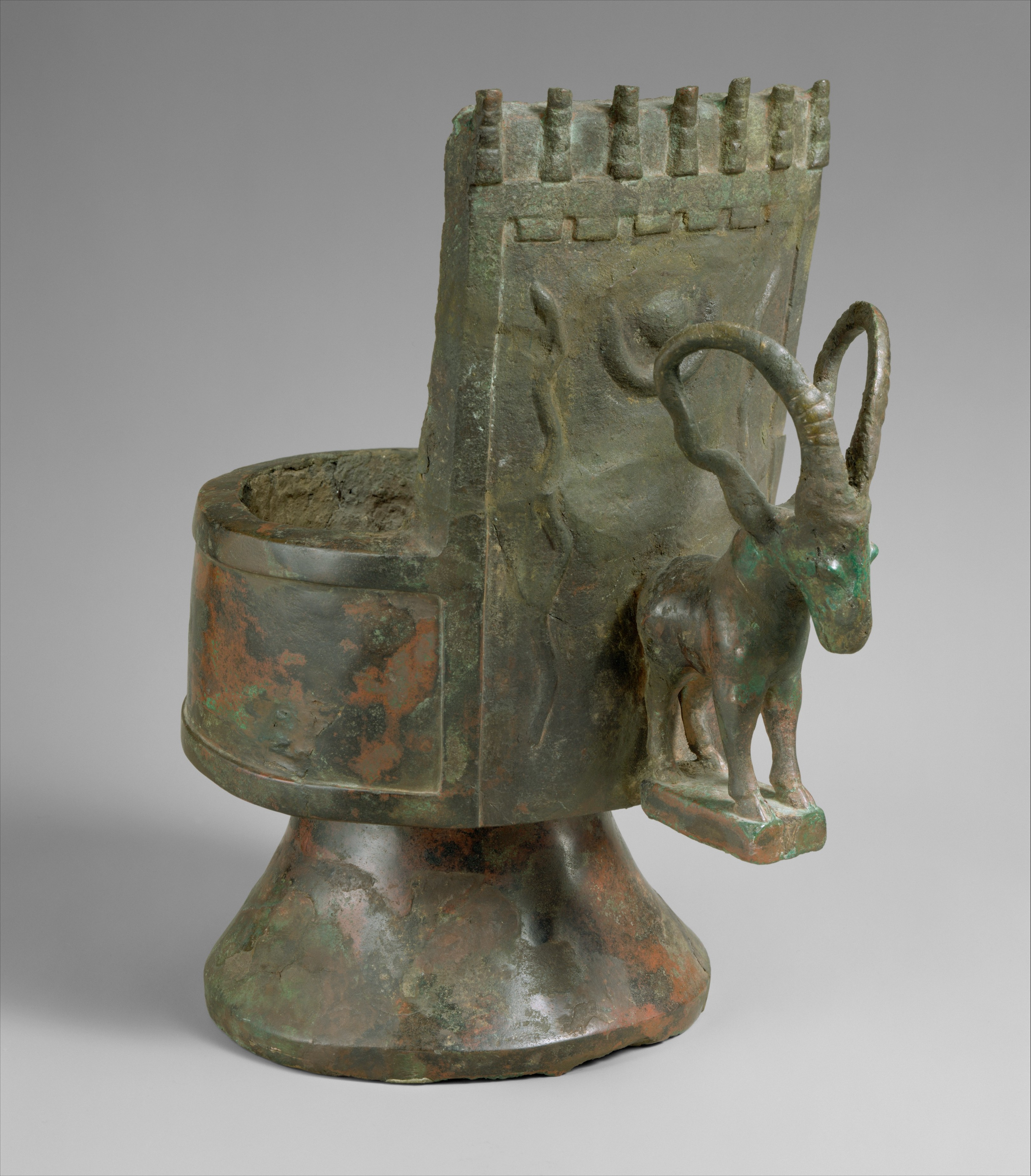
Incense burner; mid-1st millennium BC; bronze; height: 27.6 cm, width: 23.7 cm; depth: 23.3 cm; from Southwestern Arabia; Metropolitan Museum of Art

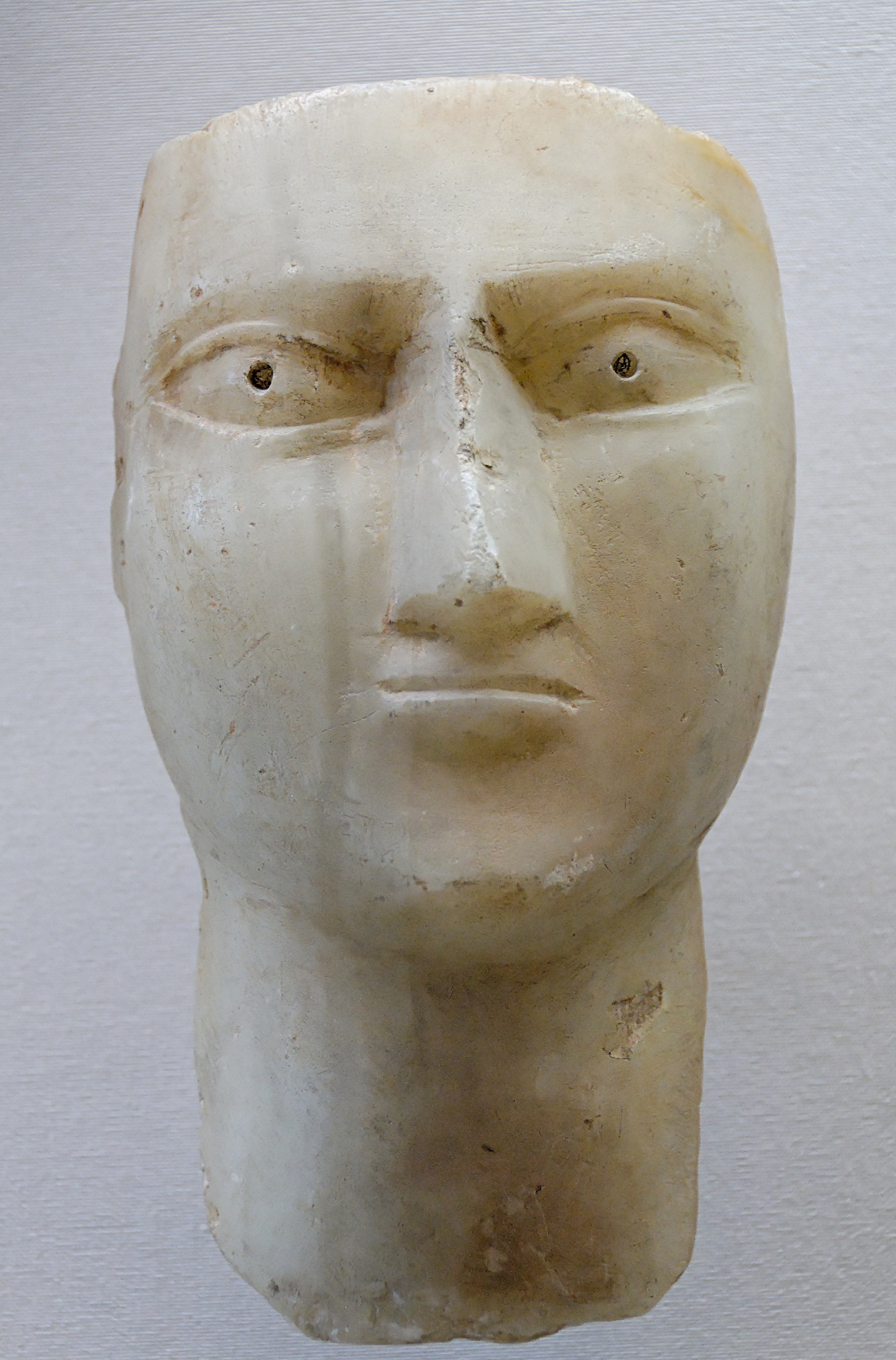
South Arabian head; 300-1 BC; alabaster; height: 20.5 cm, length: 11 cm, depth: 8.5 cm; Louvre

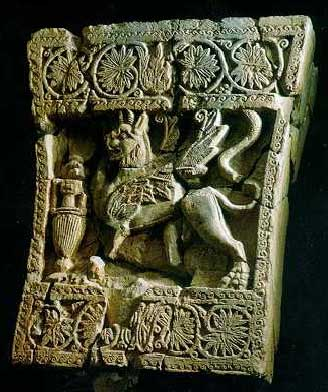
Decorated capital of a pillar from the royal palace of Shabwa; stratigraphic context: first half of the 3rd century BC; National Museum of Yemen (Aden)

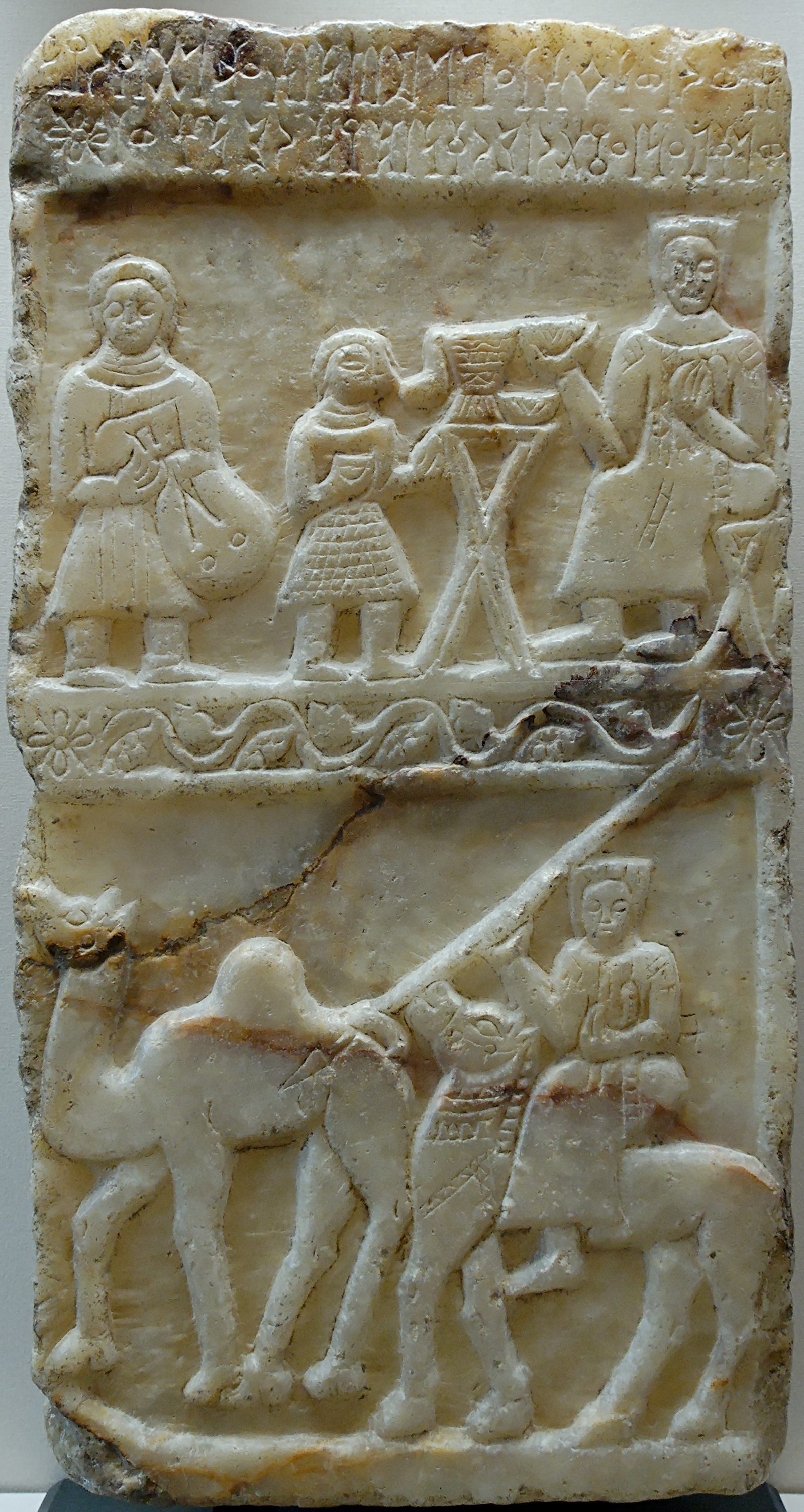
Funerary stele; 1st-3rd centuries AD; alabaster; height: 55 cm, width: 29 cm, depth: 8 cm; Louvre

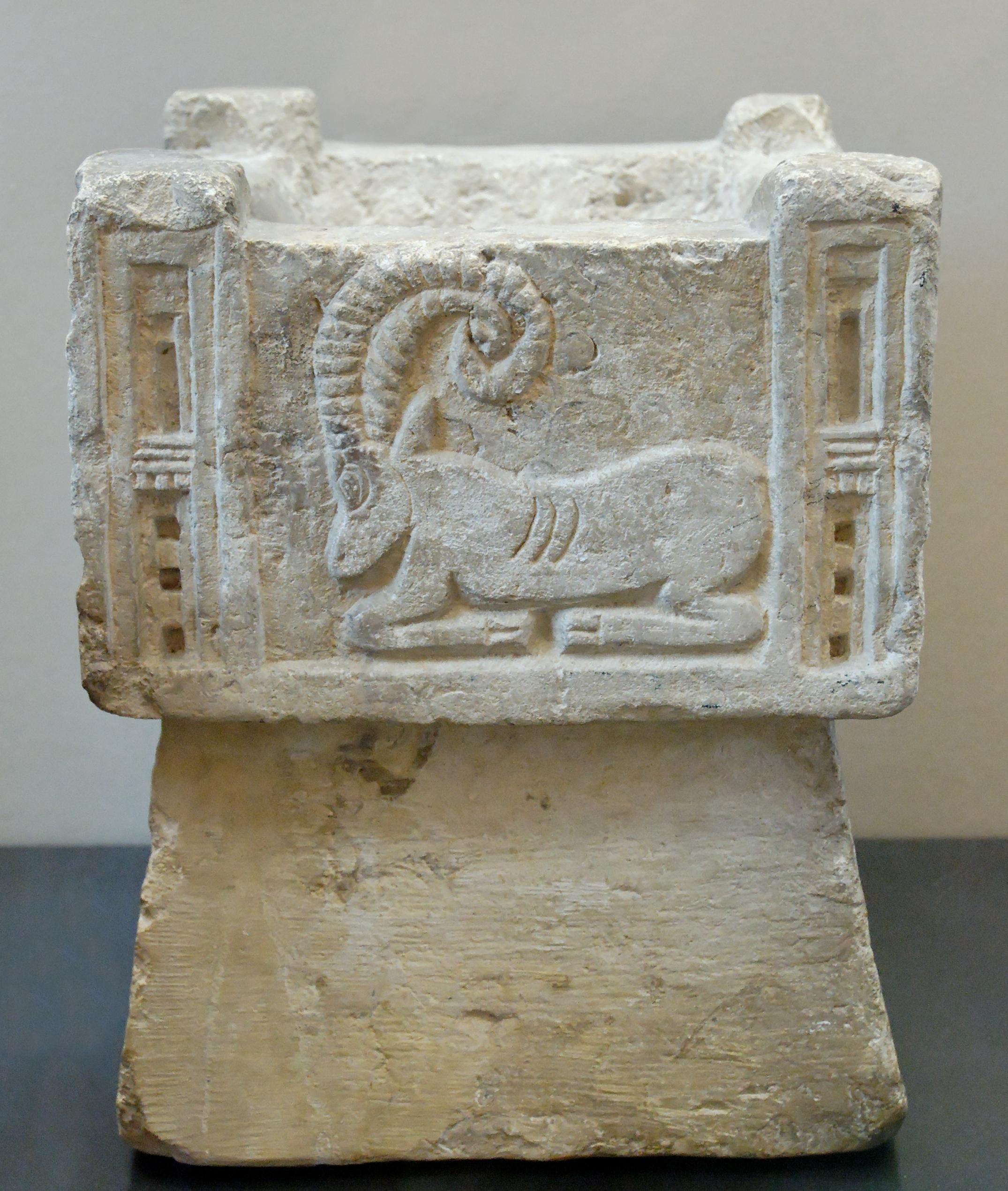
Perfume-burner with an ibex; 1st–3rd century AD; limestone; from Yemen; height: 30 cm, width: 24 cm, depth: 24 cm; Louvre

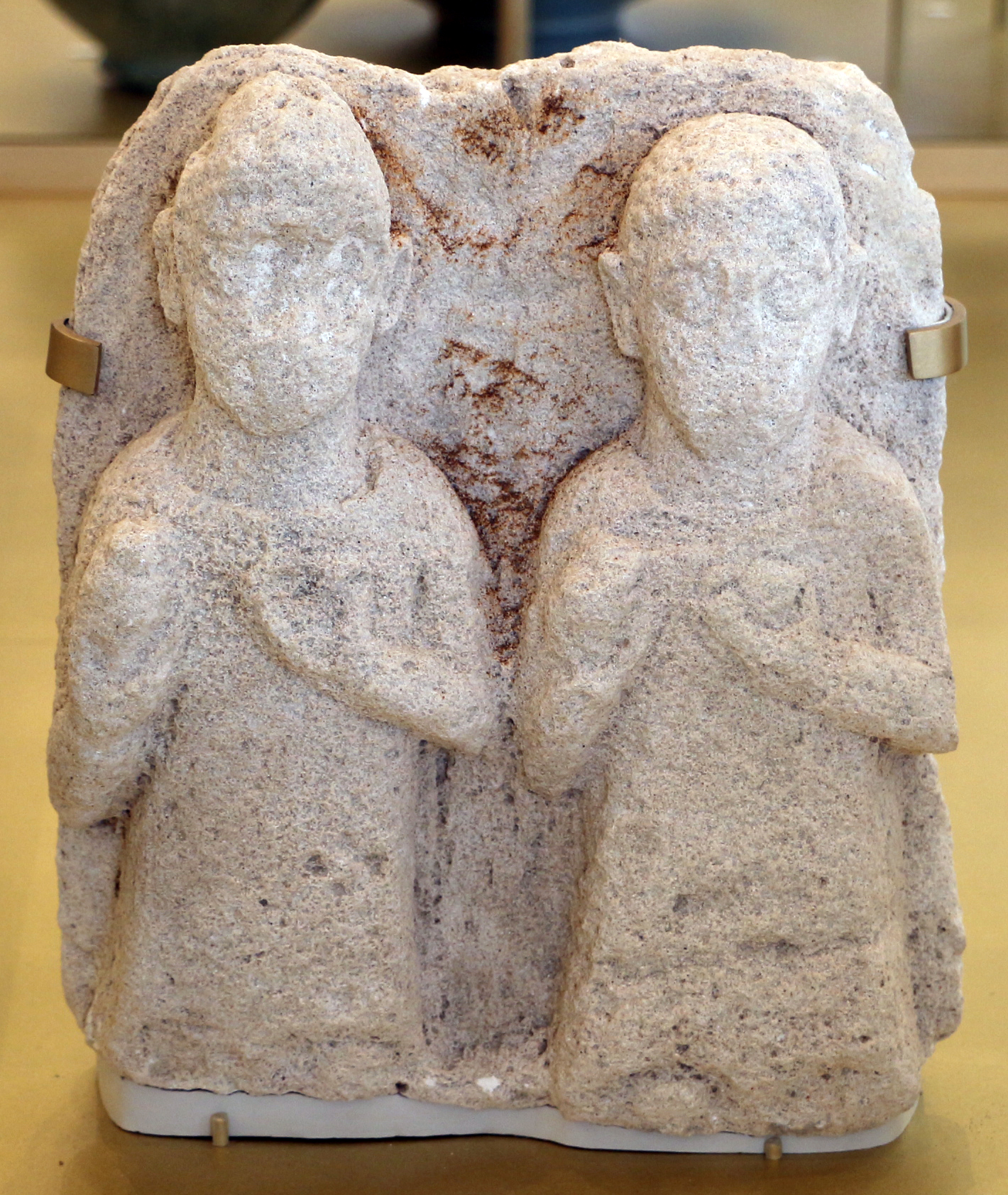
Bahraini figurative funerary stele; about 2nd-3rd century; the Bahrain pavilion of Expo 2015 (Milan, Italy)

=== Egyptian ===
Due to the highly religious nature of ancient Ancient Egyptian civilization, many of the great works of ancient Egypt depict gods, goddesses, and Pharaohs, who were also considered divine. The idea of order characterizes ancient Egyptian art. Clear and simple lines combined with simple shapes and flat areas of colour helped to create a sense of order and balance in the art of ancient Egypt. Ancient Egyptian artists used vertical and horizontal reference lines to maintain the correct proportions in their work. Political and religious, as well as artistic, order was also maintained in Egyptian art. To clearly define the social hierarchy of a situation, figures were drawn to sizes that were based not on their distance from the painter's perspective but on relative importance. For instance, the Pharaoh would be drawn as the largest figure in a painting no matter where he was situated, and a greater God would be drawn larger than a lesser god.

Symbolism also played an important role in establishing a sense of order. Symbolism, ranging from the Pharaoh's regalia (symbolizing his power to maintain order) to the individual symbols of Egyptian gods and goddesses, was omnipresent in Egyptian art. Animals were usually also highly symbolic figures in Egyptian art. Colour, as well, had extended meaning—blue and green represented the Nile and life; yellow stood for the sun god; and red represented power and vitality. The colours in Egyptian artifacts have survived extremely well over the centuries because of Egypt's dry climate.

Despite the stilted form caused by a lack of perspective, ancient Egyptian art is often highly realistic. Ancient Egyptian artists often show a sophisticated knowledge of anatomy and close attention to detail, especially in their renderings of animals. During the 18th Dynasty of Egypt a Pharaoh by the name of Akhenaton took the throne and abolished the traditional polytheism. He formed a monotheistic religion based on the worship of Aten, a sun god. Artistic change followed political upheaval. A new style of art was introduced that was more naturalistic than the stylized frieze favored in Egyptian art for the previous 1700 years. After Akhenaton's death, however, Egyptian artists reverted to their old styles.

Faience that was produced in ancient Egyptian antiquity as early as 3500 BC was in fact superior to the tin-glazed earthenware of the European 15th century. Ancient Egyptian faience was not made of clay but instead actually of a ceramic composed primarily of quartz.

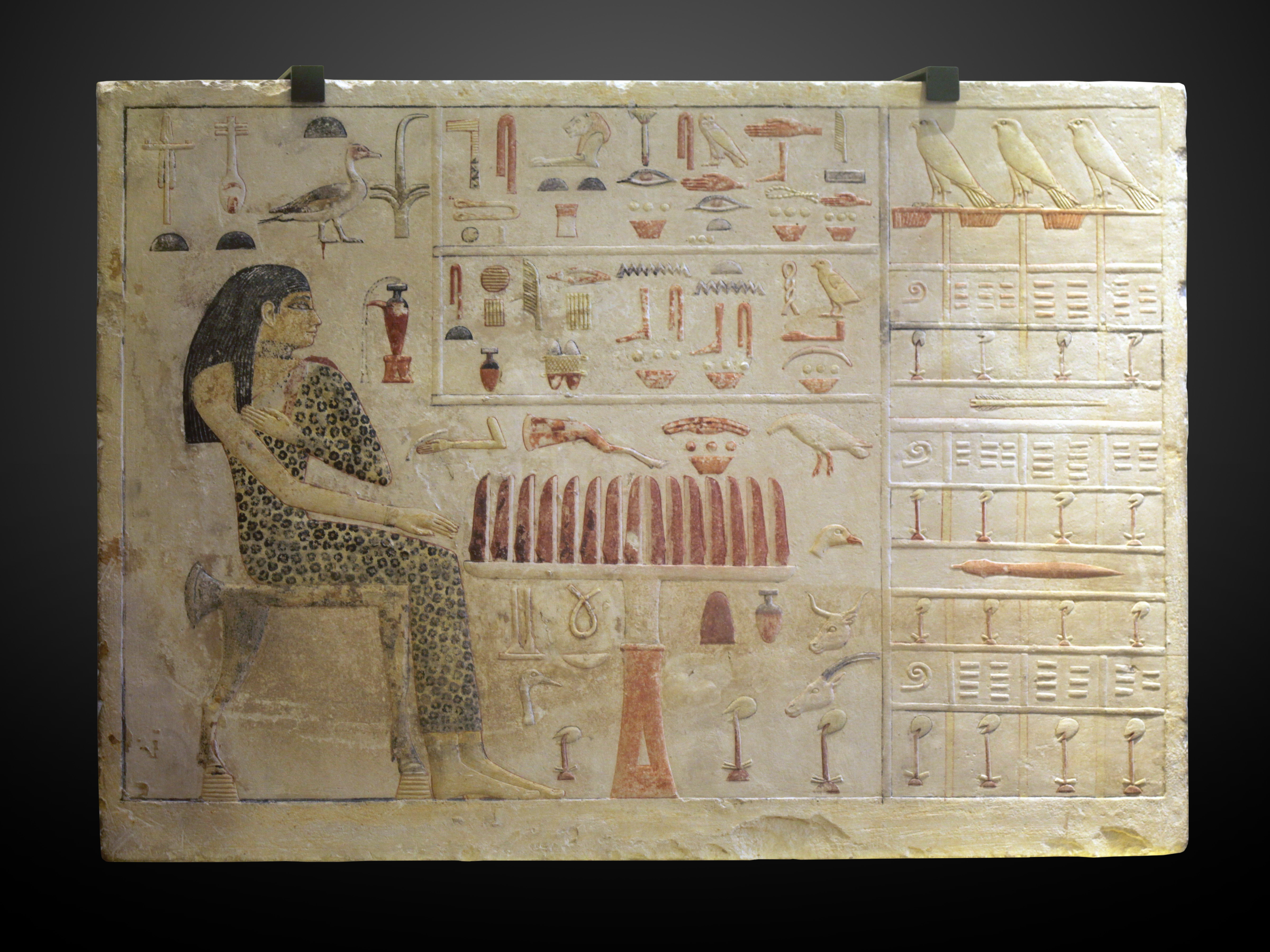
Stele of Princess Nefertiabet eating; 2589–2566 BC; limestone & paint; height: 37.7 cm, length: 52.5 cm, depth: 8.3 cm; from Giza; Louvre (Paris)

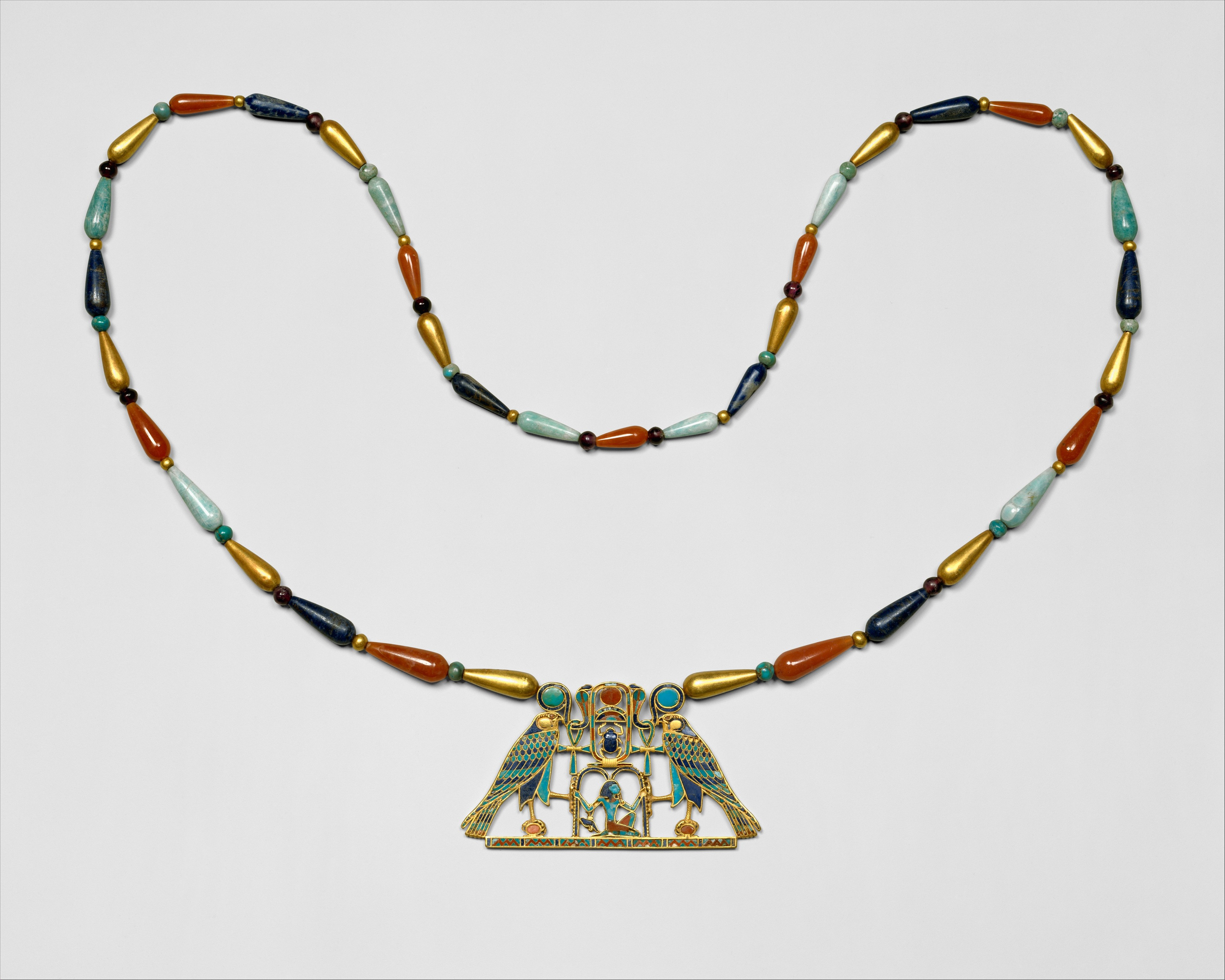
Pectoral and necklace of Princess Sithathoriunet; 1887–1813 BC; gold, carnelian, lapis lazuli, turquoise, garnet & feldspar; height of the pectoral: 4.5 cm; Metropolitan Museum of Art (New York City)

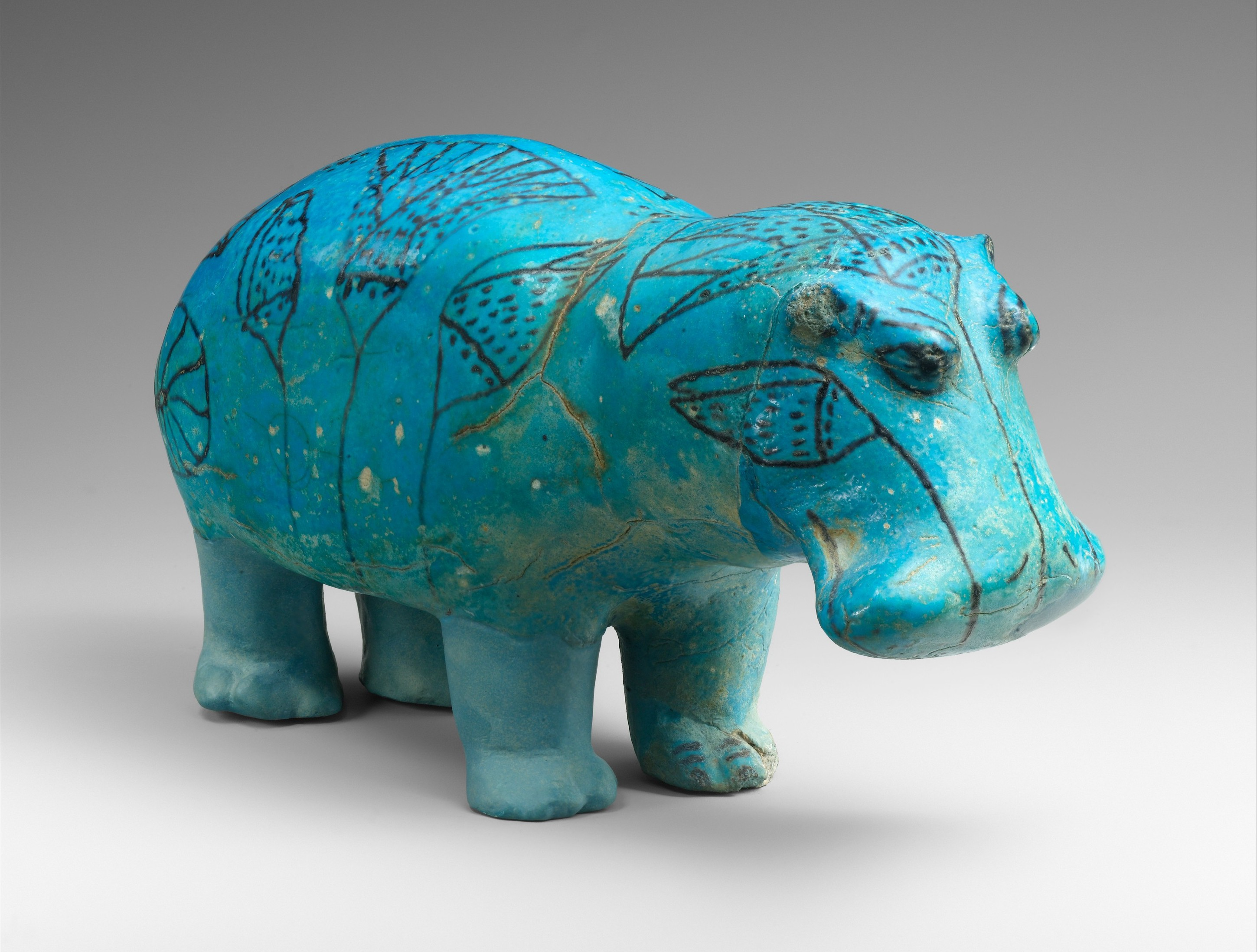
William the Faience Hippopotamus; 1961–1878 BC; faience; 11.2 × 7.5 cm; Metropolitan Museum of Art

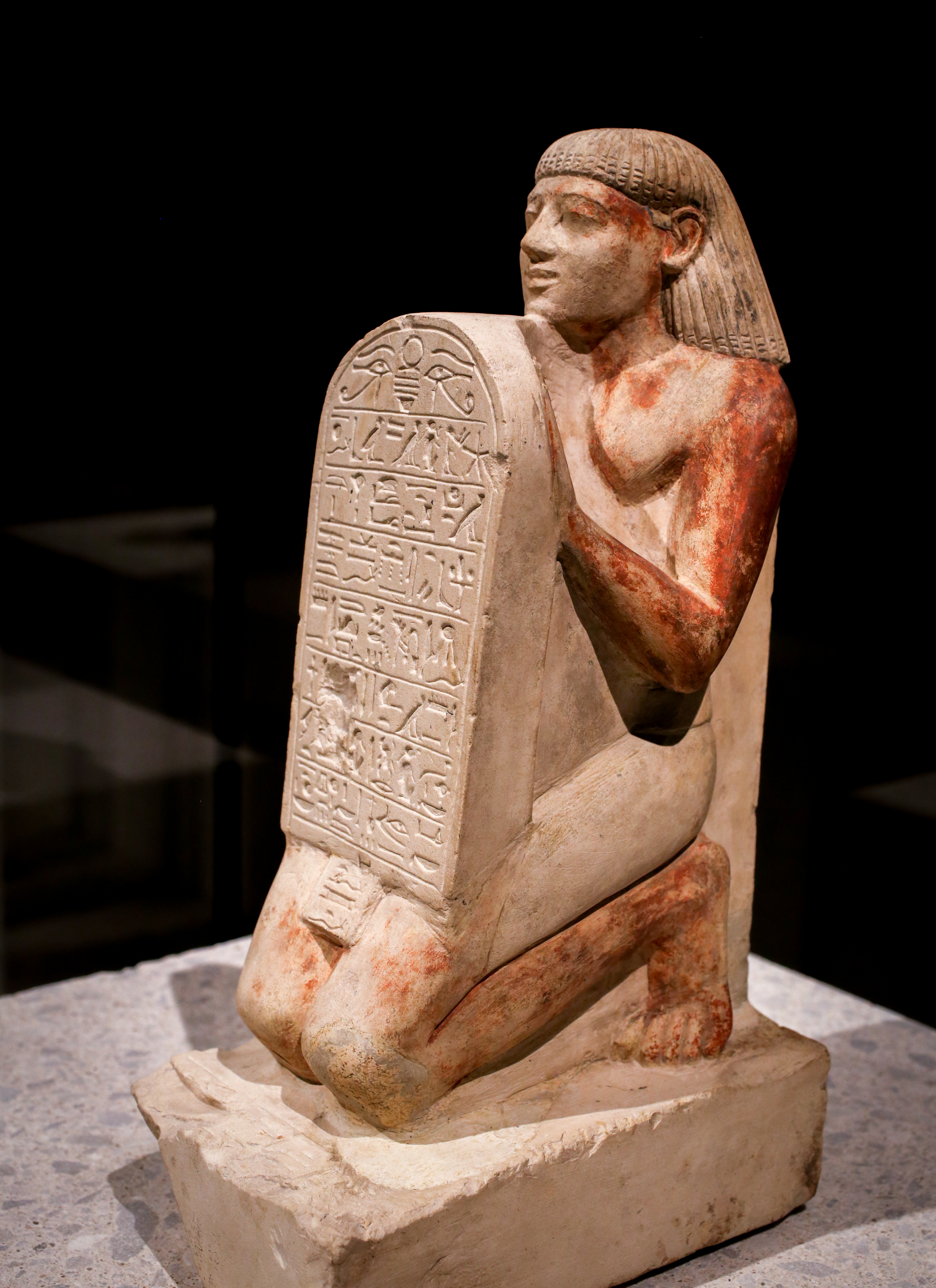
Kneeling portrait statue of Amenemhat holding a stele with an inscription; circa 1500 BC; limestone; Egyptian Museum of Berlin (Germany)

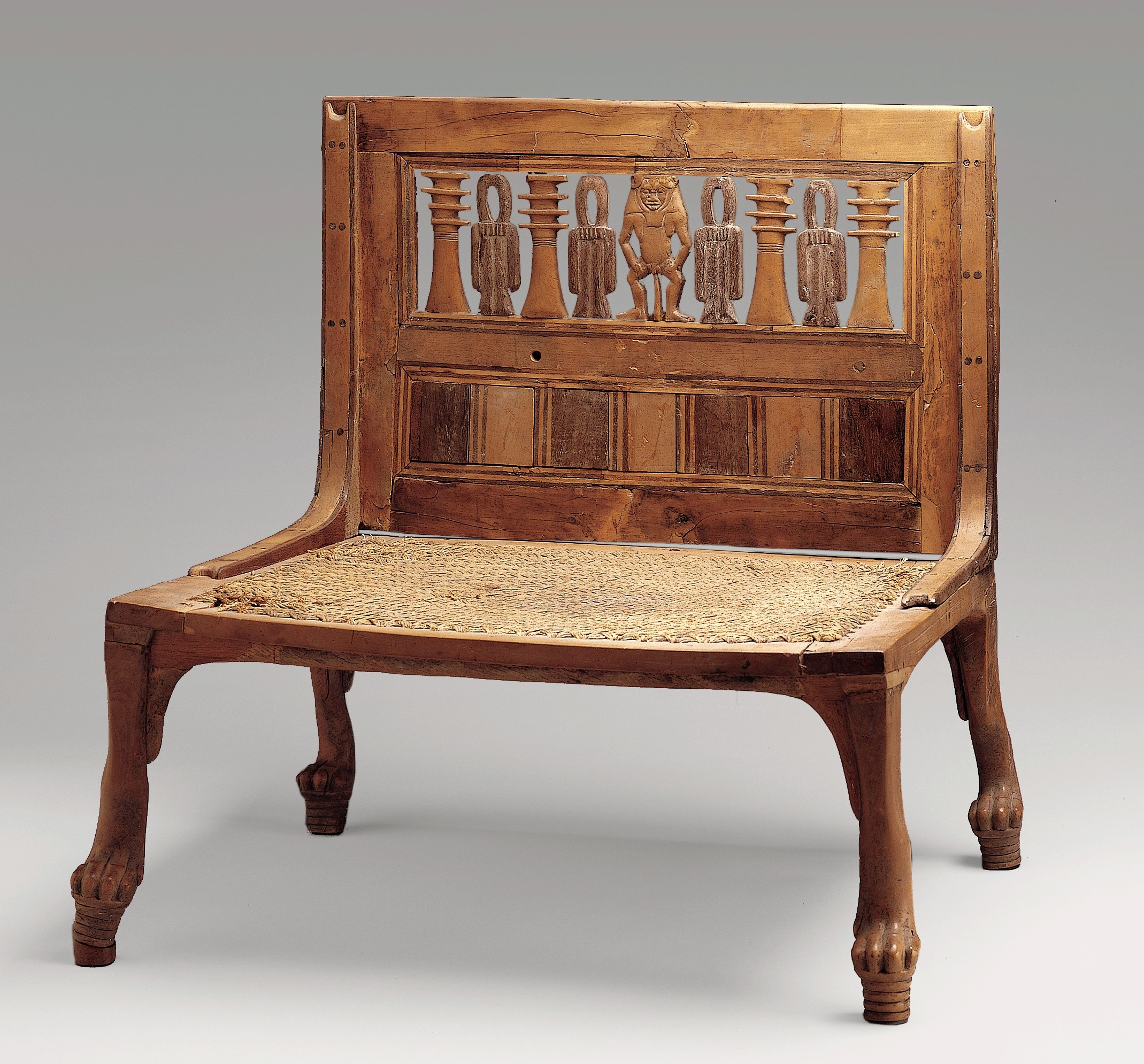
Chair of Hatnefer; 1492–1473 BC; boxwood, cypress, ebony & linen cord; height: 53 cm; Metropolitan Museum of Art

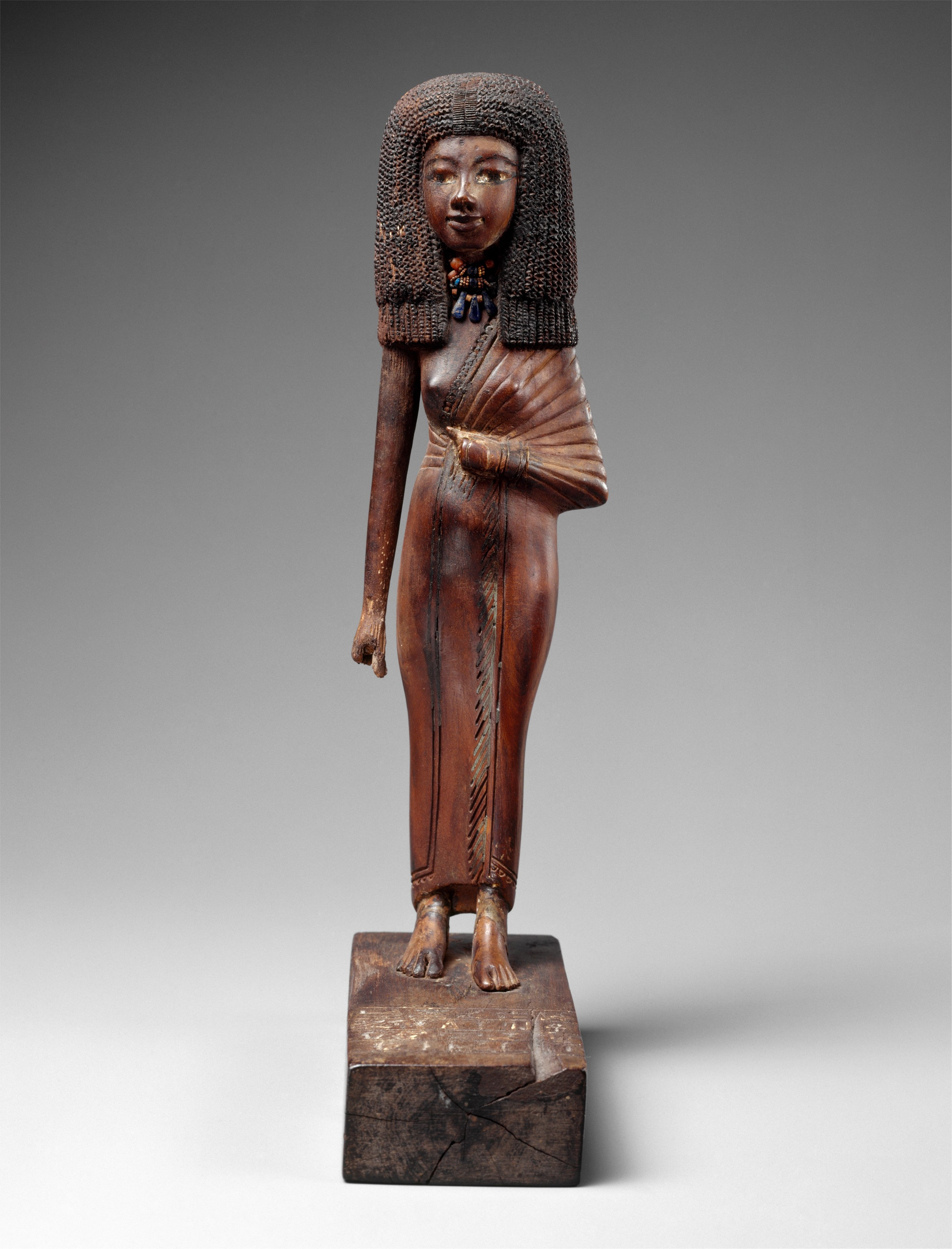
Statuette of the lady Tiye; 1390-1349 BC; wood, carnelian, gold, glass, Egyptian blue and paint; height: 24 cm; Metropolitan Museum of Art

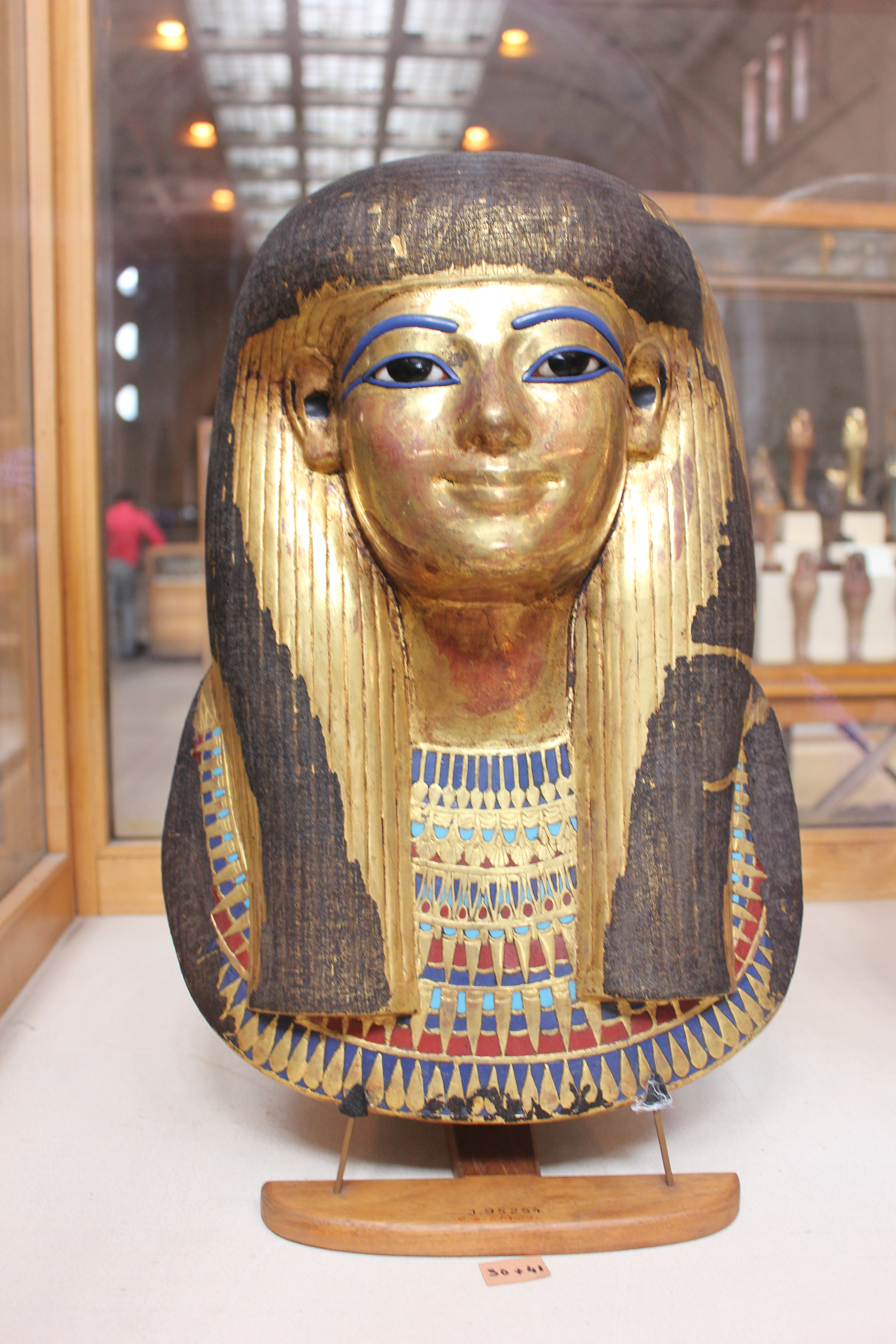
Mask of Tjuyu; c. 1387–1350 BC; gold, past of glass, alabaster and other materials; height: 40 cm; Egyptian Museum (Cairo)

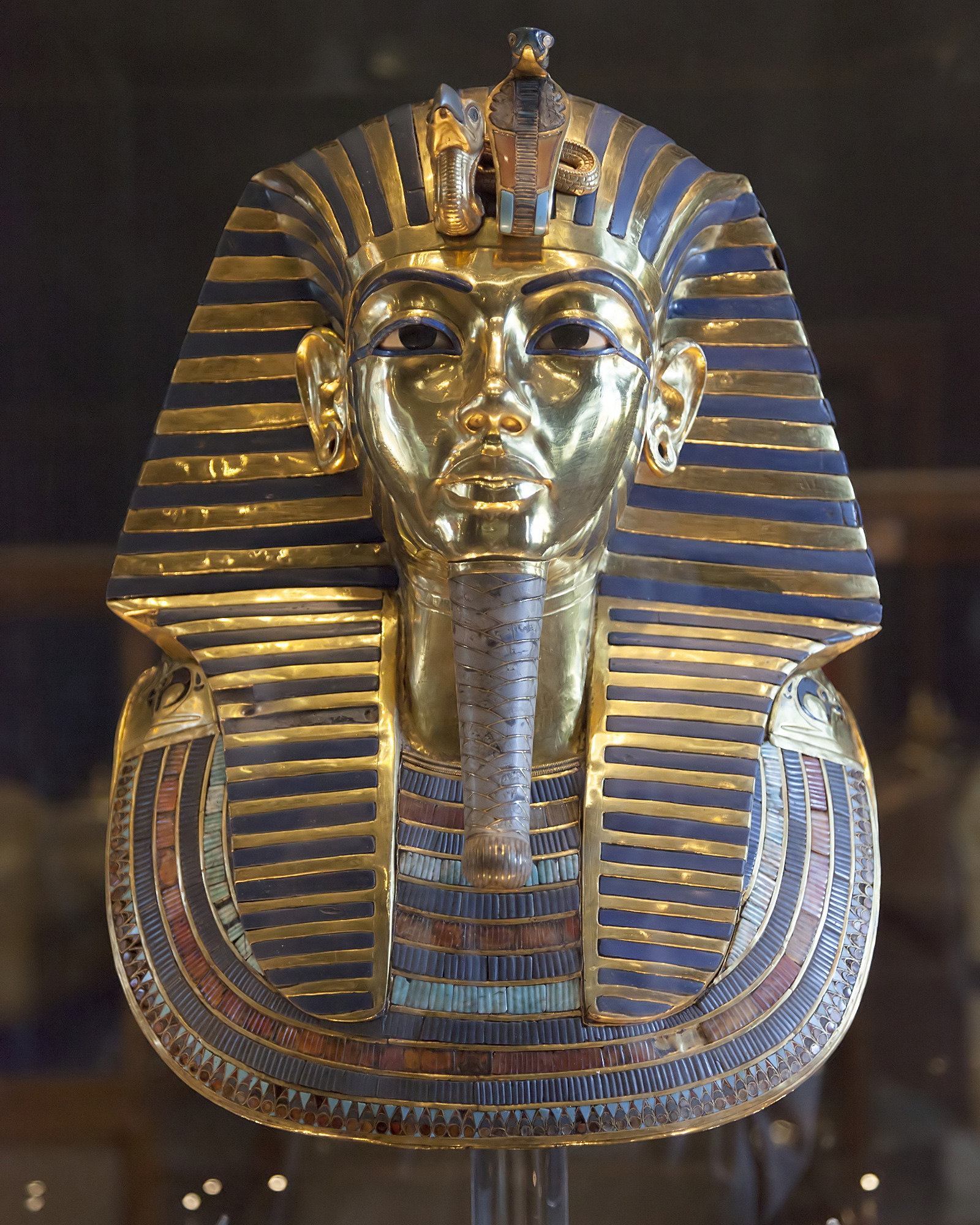
The Mask of Tutankhamun; c. 1327 BC; gold, glass and semi-precious stones; height: 54 cm; Egyptian Museum

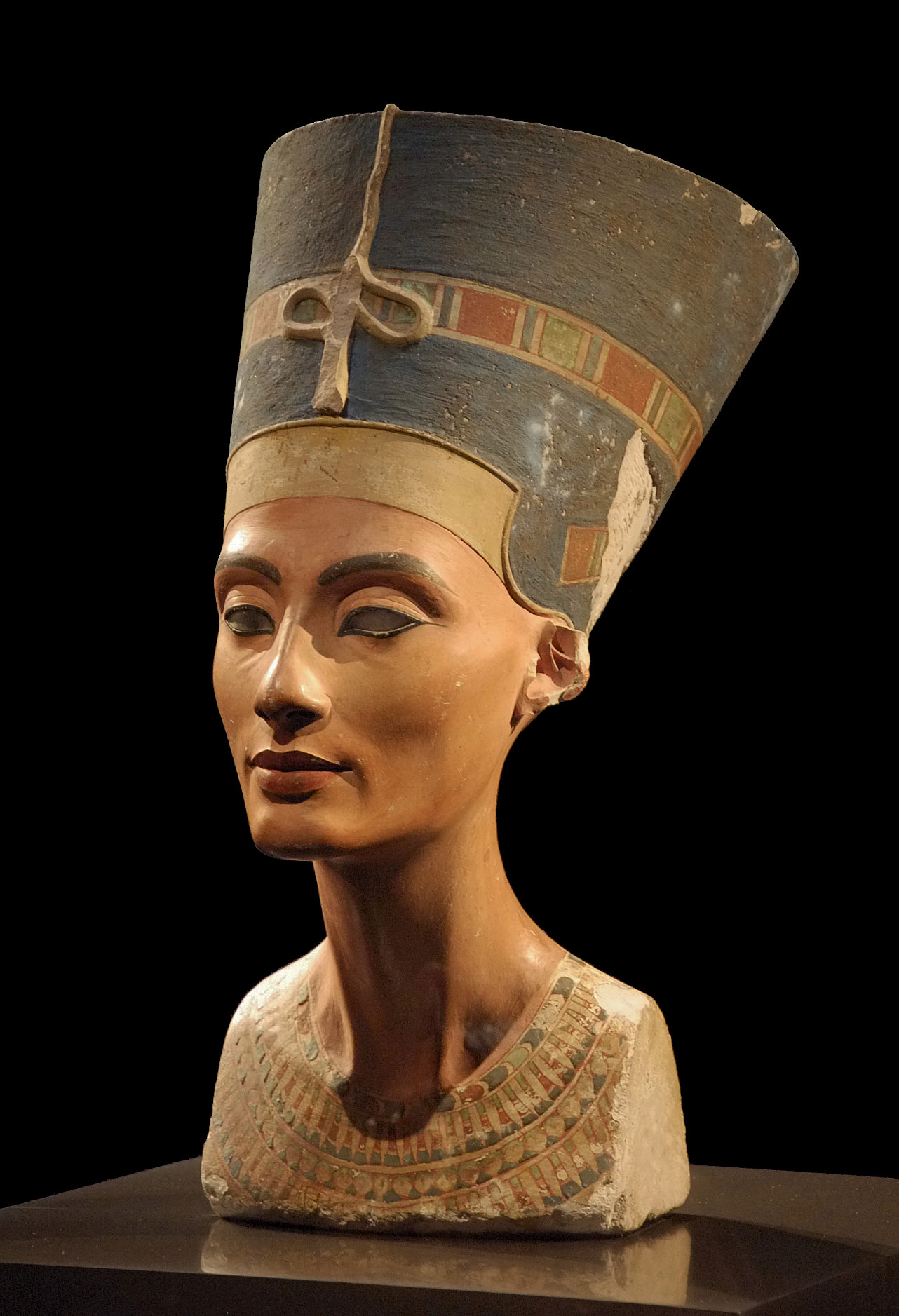
The Nefertiti Bust; 1352–1332 BC; painted limestone; height: 50 cm; Neues Museum (Berlin, Germany)

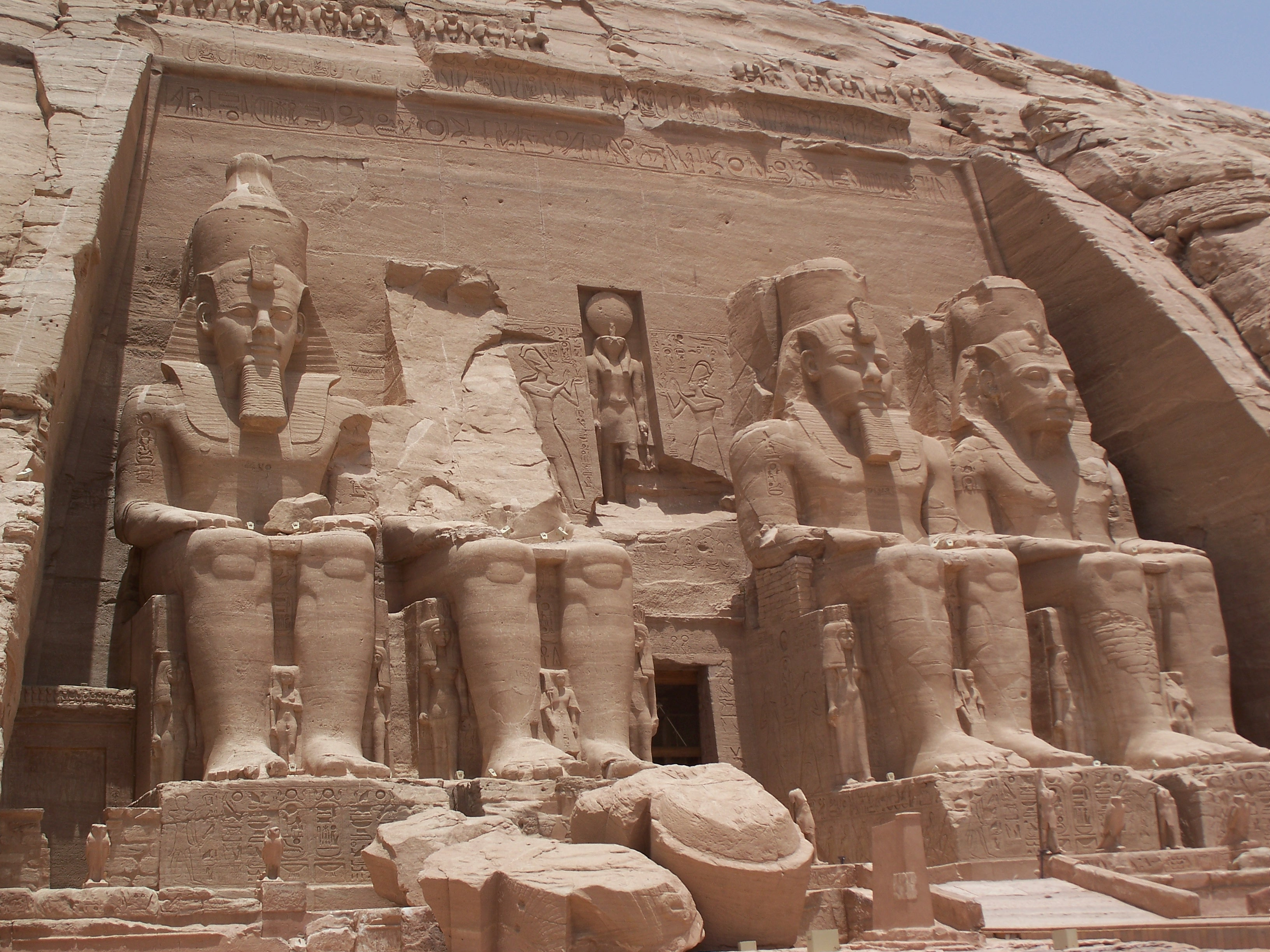
The entrance of the Great Temple of the Abu Simbel temples, founded around 1264 BC

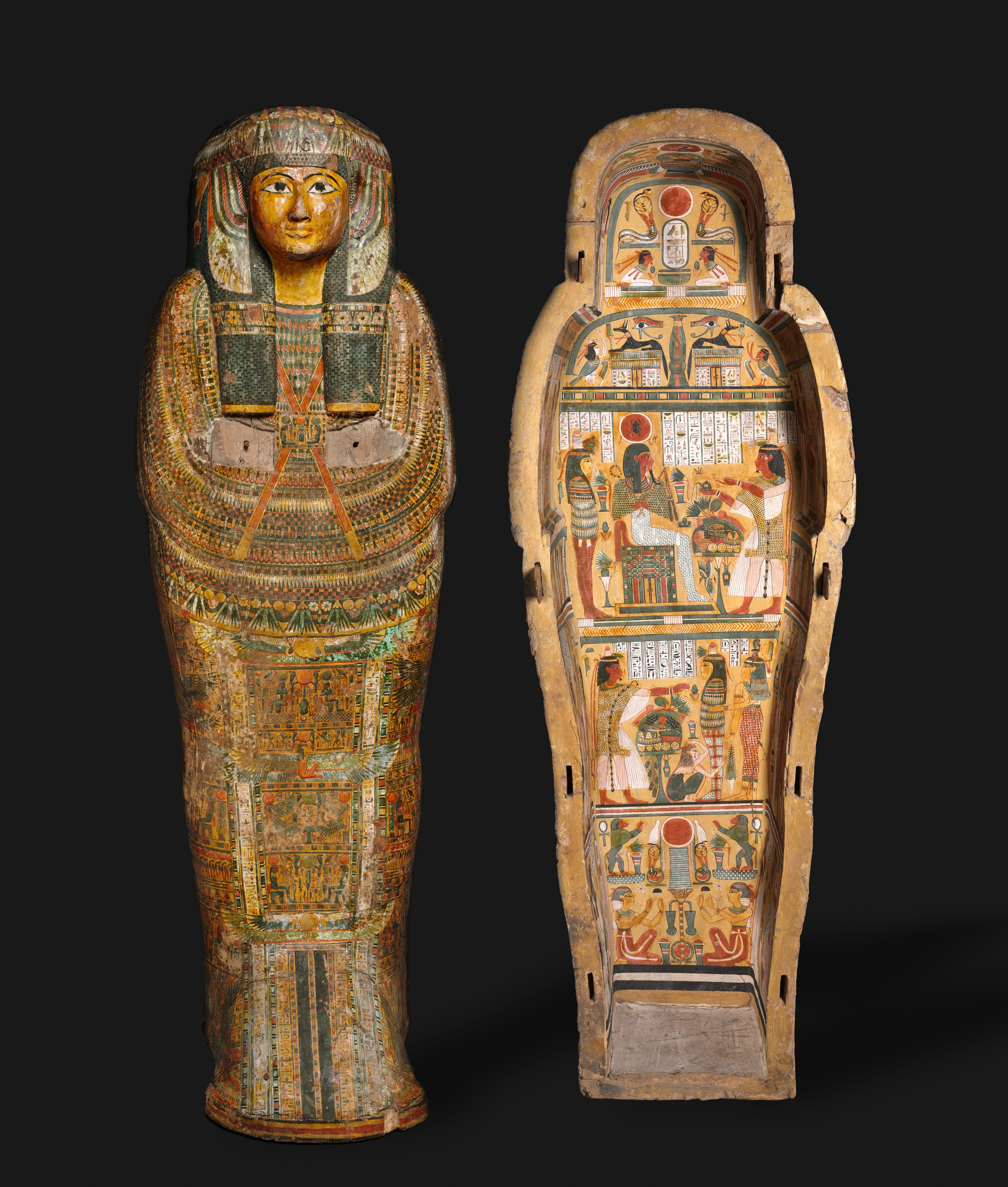
Coffin of Nesykhonsu; c. 976 BC; gessoed and painted sycamore fig; overall: 70 cm; Cleveland Museum of Art (Cleveland, Ohio, US)

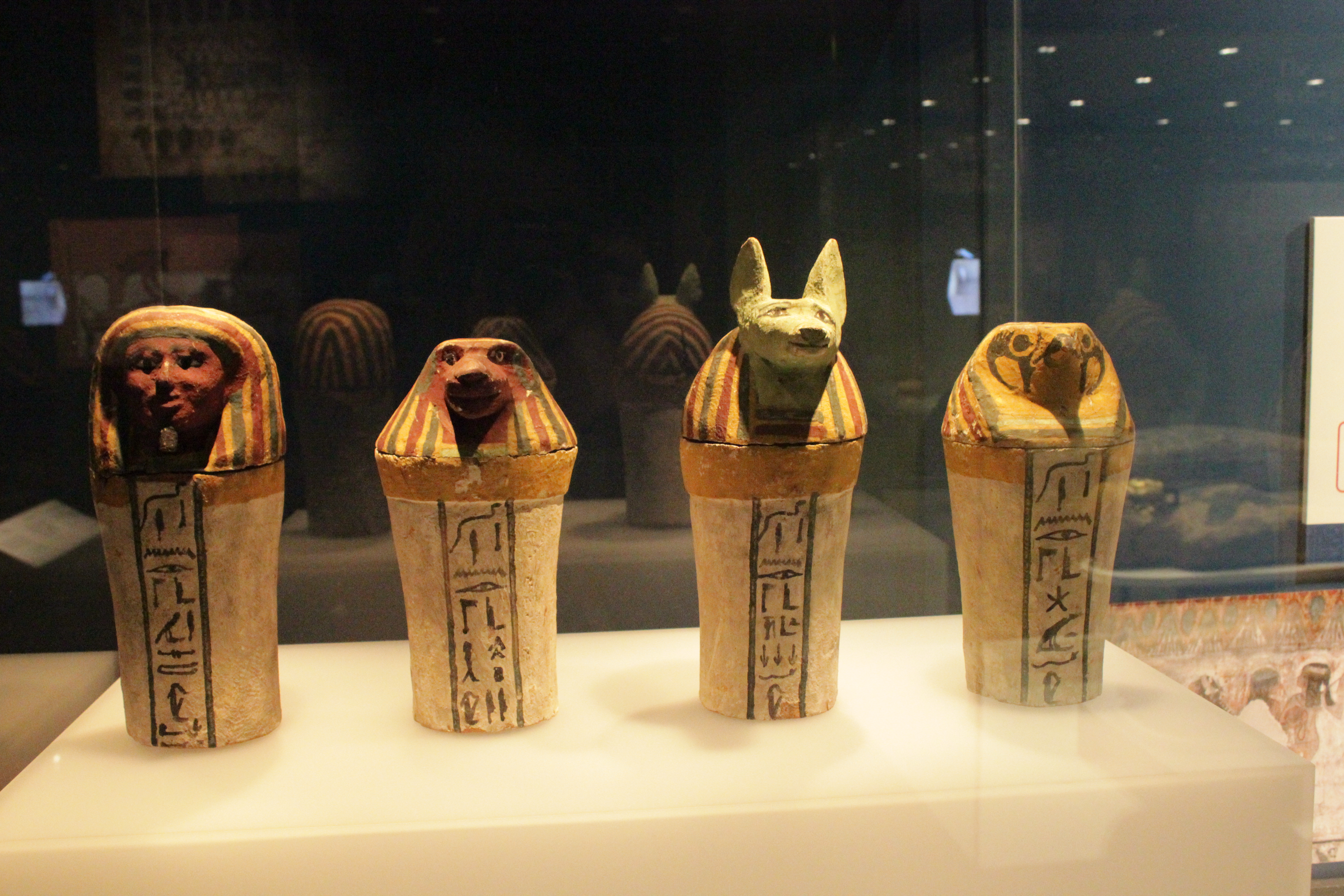
Complete set of canopic jars decorated with hieroglyphics; 744–656 BC; painted sycomore fig wood; various heights; British Museum (London)

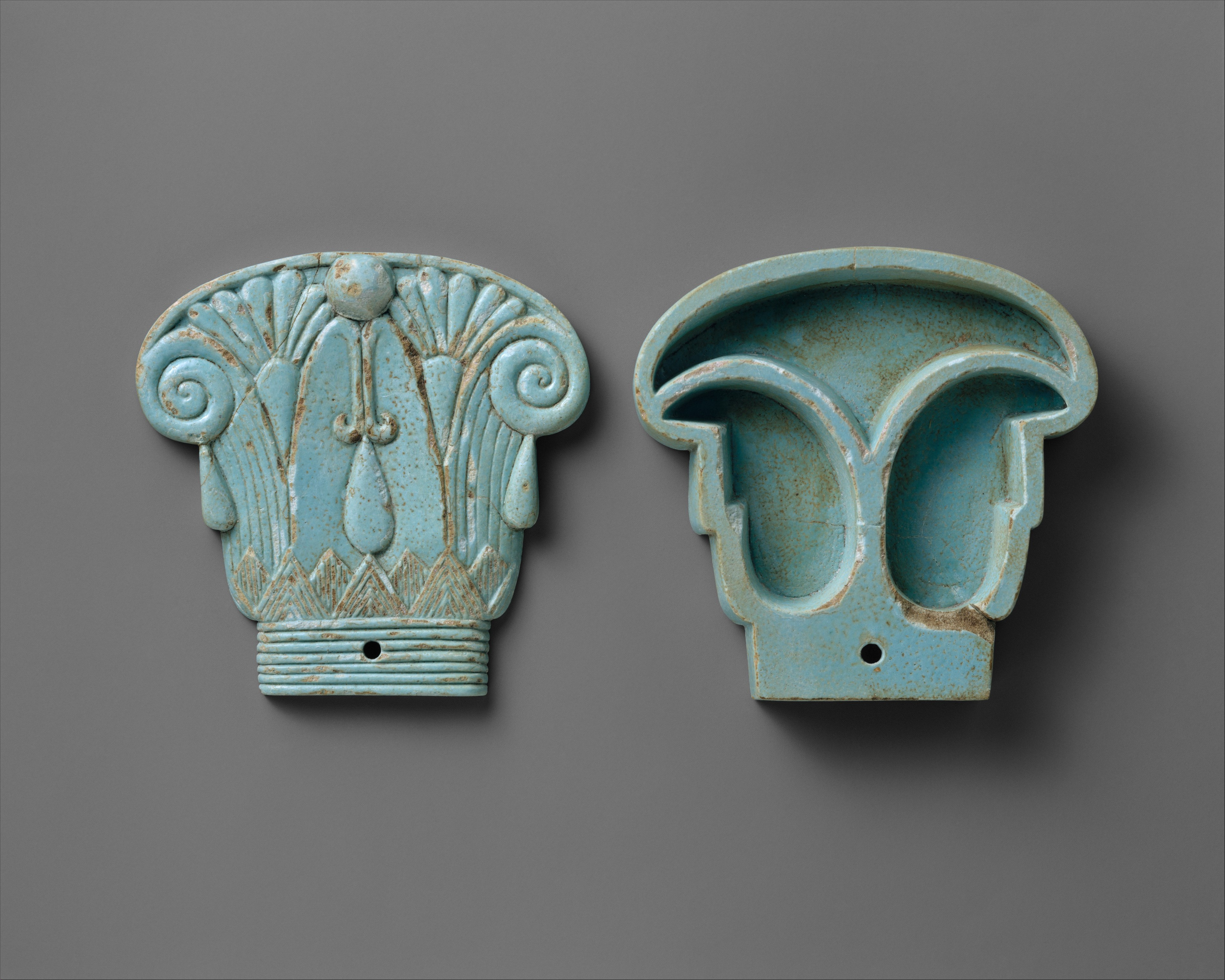
Cosmetic box in the shape of an Egyptian composite capital, its cap being in the left side; 664–300 BC; glassy faience; 8.5 × 9 cm; Metropolitan Museum of Art

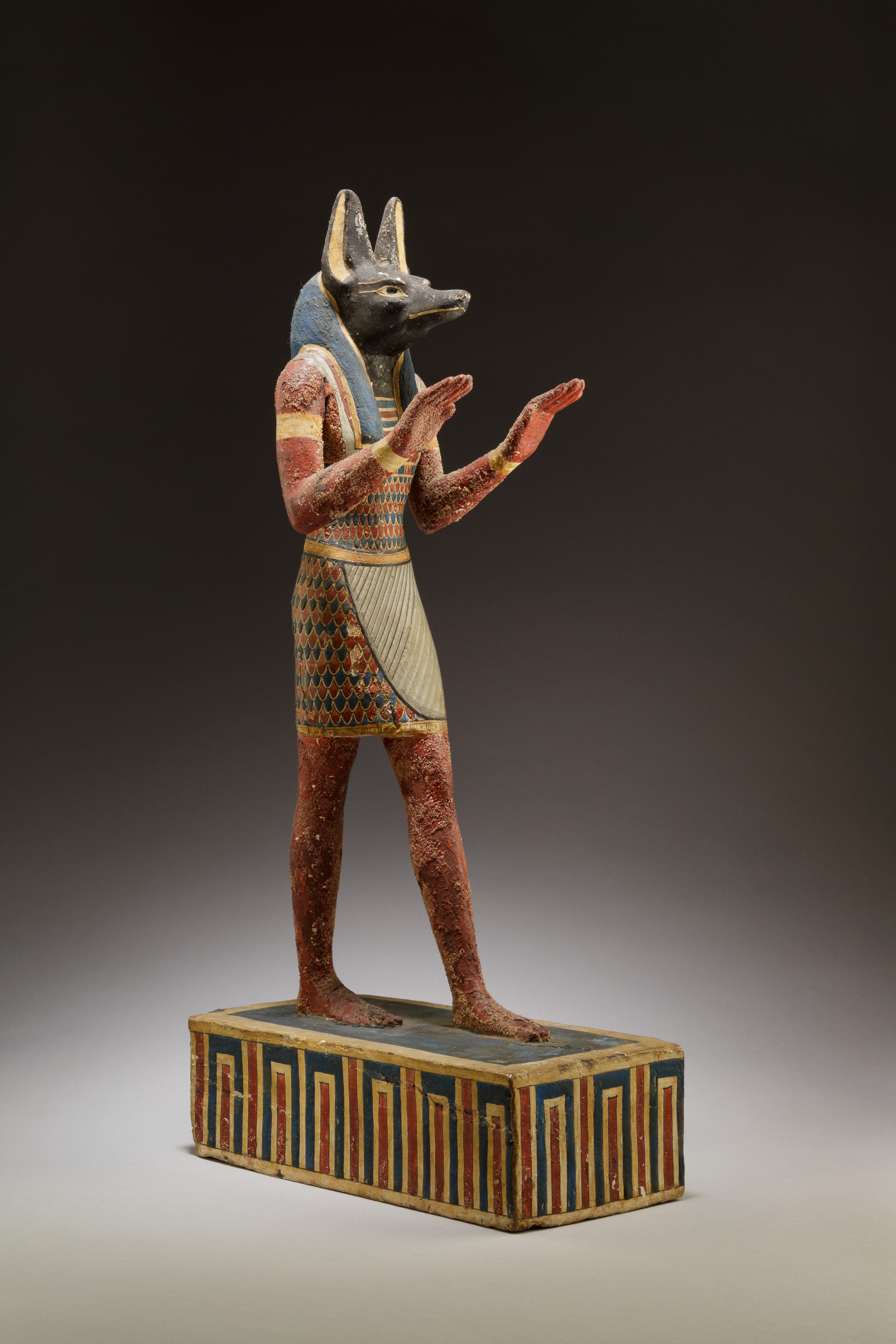
Statuette of Anubis; 332–30 BC; plastered and painted wood; 42.3 cm; Metropolitan Museum of Art

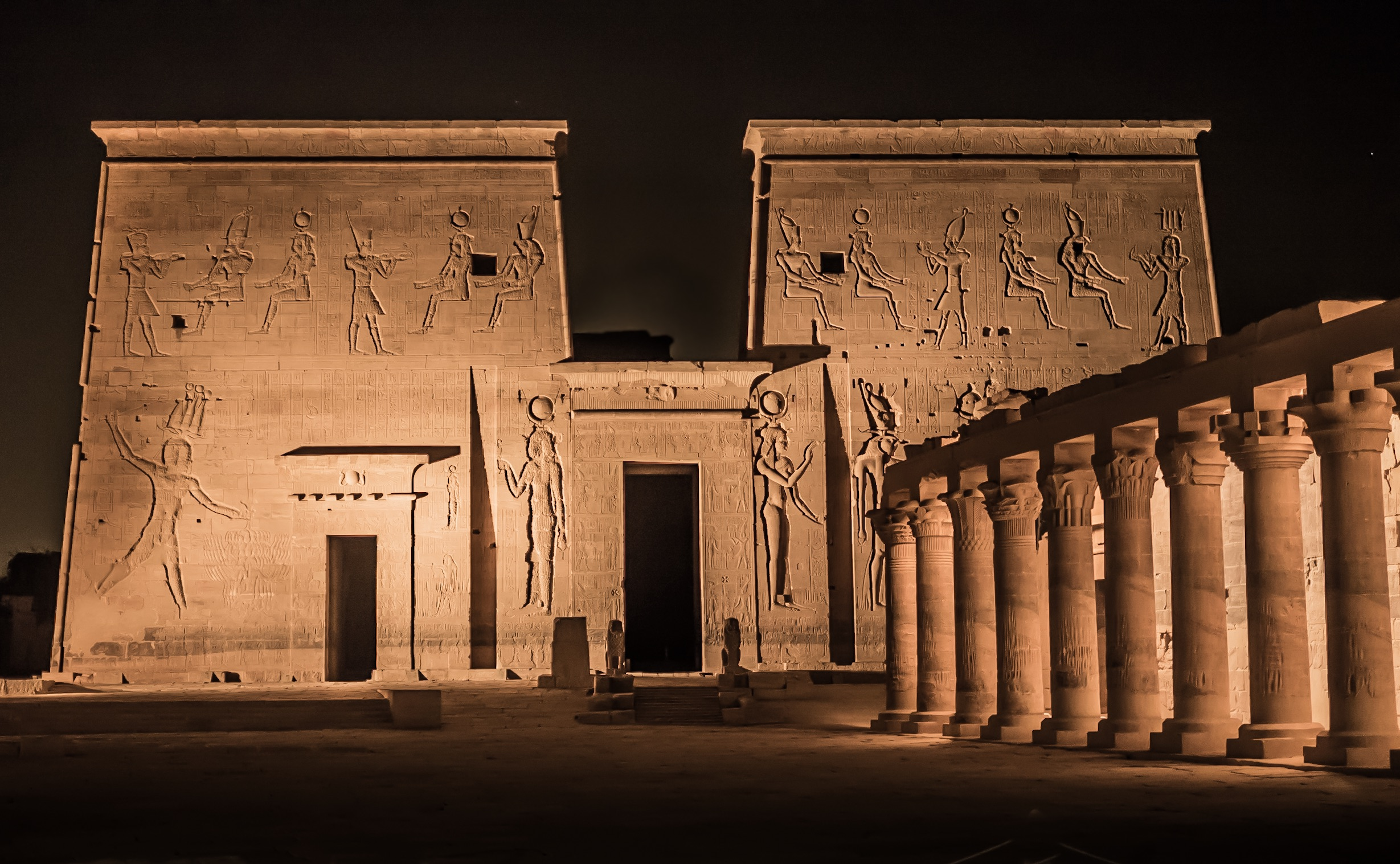
The well preserved The Temple of Isis from Philae (Egypt) is an example of Egyptian architecture and architectural sculpture

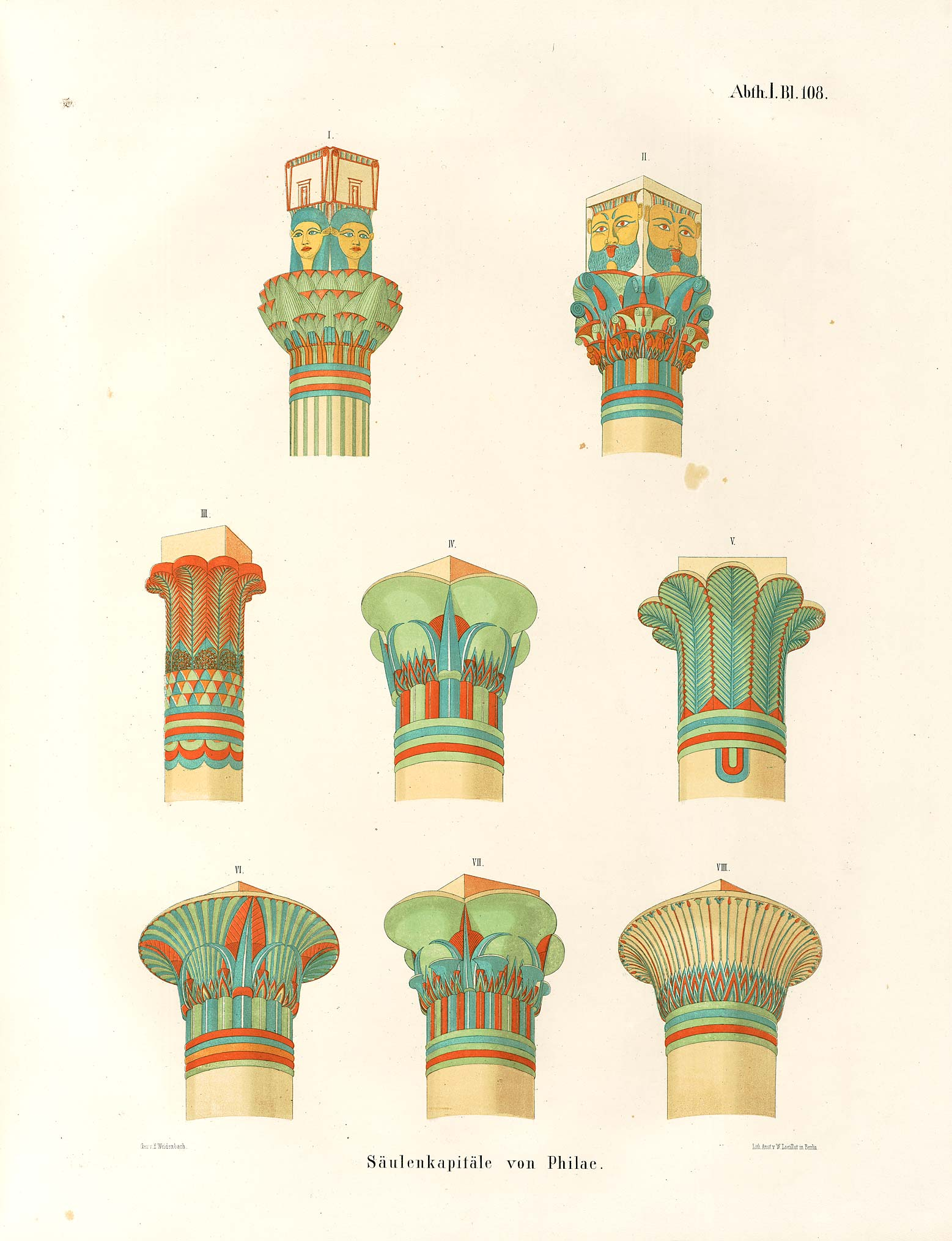
Illustration of various types of capitals, drawn by the egyptologist Karl Richard Lepsius

=== Etruscan ===
Etruscan art was produced by the Etruscan civilization in central Italy between the 9th and 2nd centuries BC. From around 600 BC it was heavily influenced by Greek art, which was imported by the Etruscans, but always retained distinct characteristics. Particularly strong in this tradition were figurative sculpture in terracotta (especially life-size on sarcophagi or temples), wall painting, and metalworking, especially in bronze. Jewelry and engraved gems of high quality were produced.

Etruscan sculpture in cast bronze was famous and widely exported, but relatively few large examples have survived (the material was too valuable, and recycled later). In contrast to terracotta and bronze, there was relatively little Etruscan sculpture in stone, despite the Etruscans controlling fine sources of marble, including Carrara marble, which seems not to have been exploited until the Romans.

The great majority of survivals came from tombs, which were typically crammed with sarcophagi and grave goods, and terracotta fragments of architectural sculpture, mostly around temples. Tombs have produced all the fresco wall paintings, which show scenes of feasting and some narrative mythological subjects.

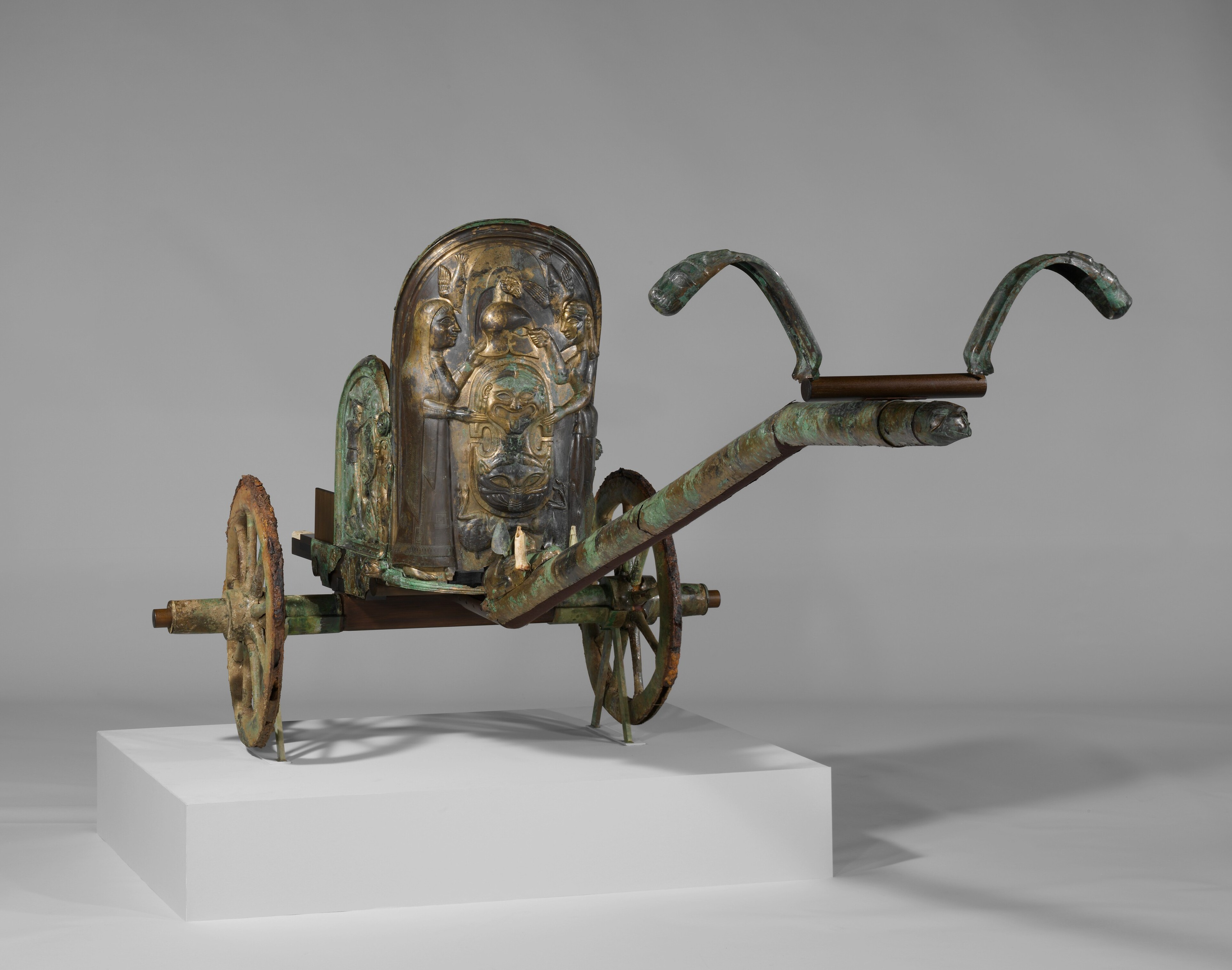
The Monteleone chariot; 2nd quarter of the 6th century BC; bronze and ivory; total height: 130.9 cm, length of the pole: 209 cm; Metropolitan Museum of Art (New York City)

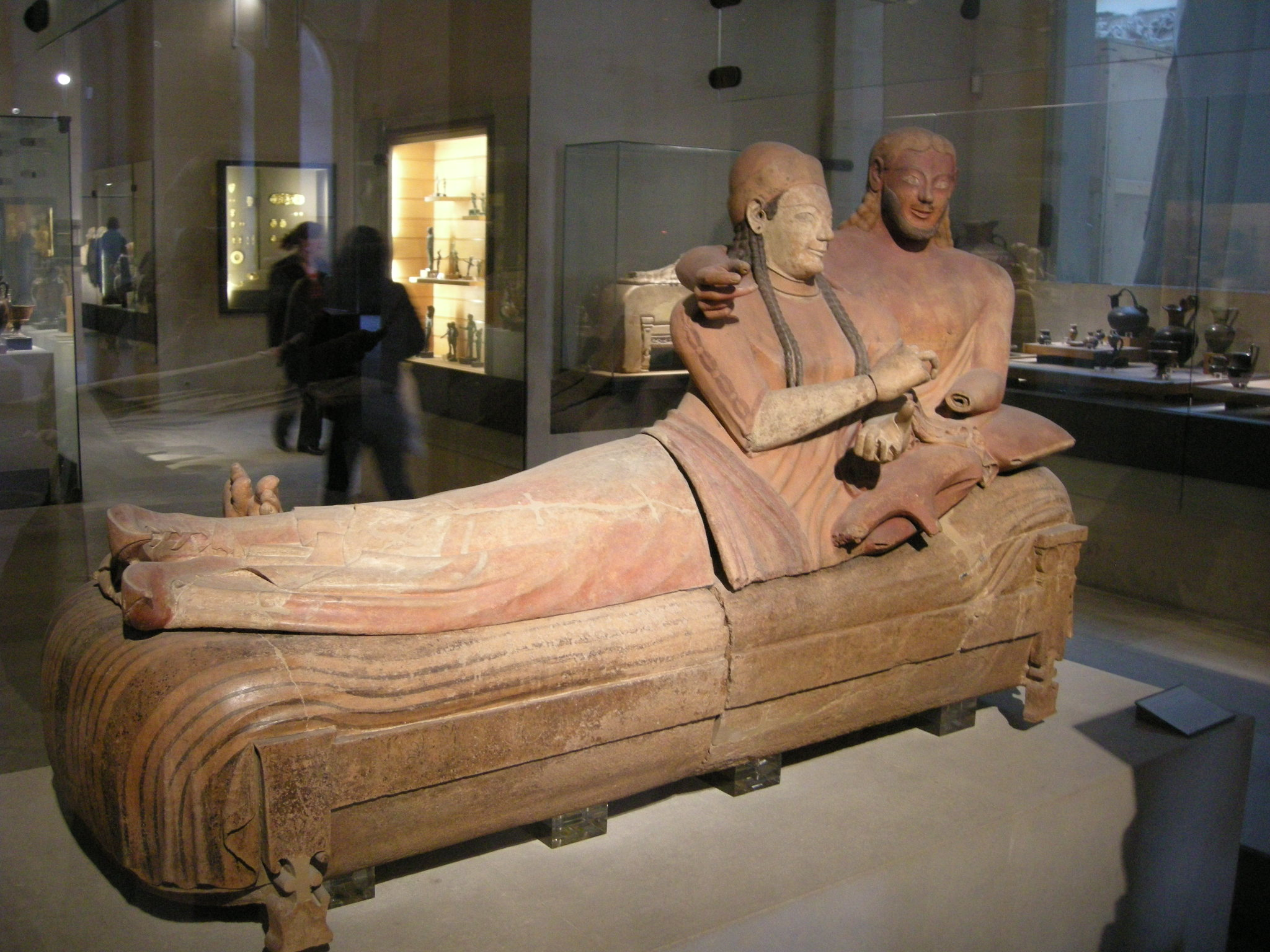
The Sarcophagus of the Spouses; 530–520 BC; terracotta; 1.14 m x 1.9 m; from a tomb of the Banditaccia necropolis (Cerveteri, Italy); Louvre

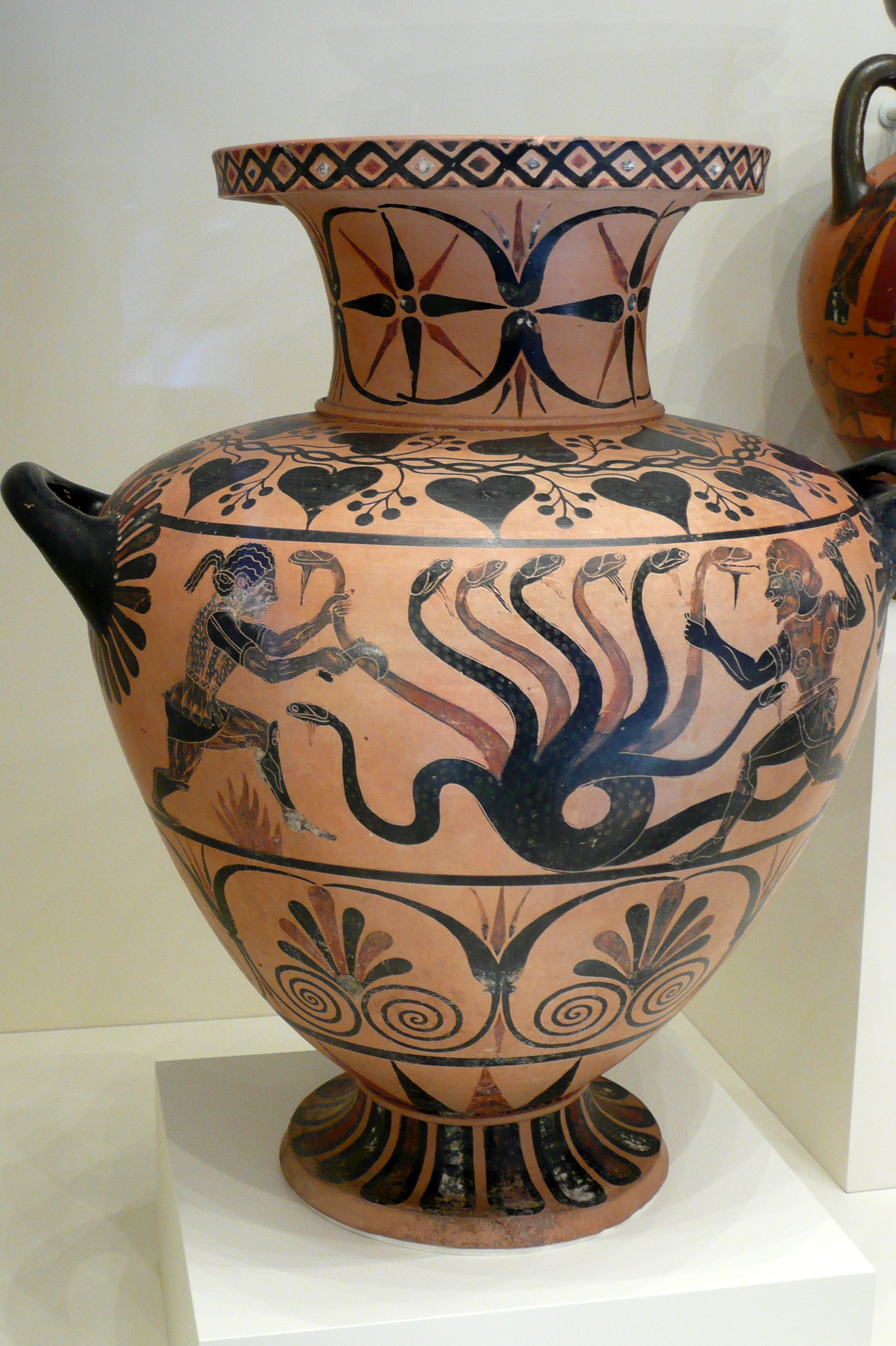
Water jar with Herakles and the Hydra; circa 525 BC; black-figure pottery; height: 44.5 cm, diameter: 33.8 cm; Getty Villa (California, US)

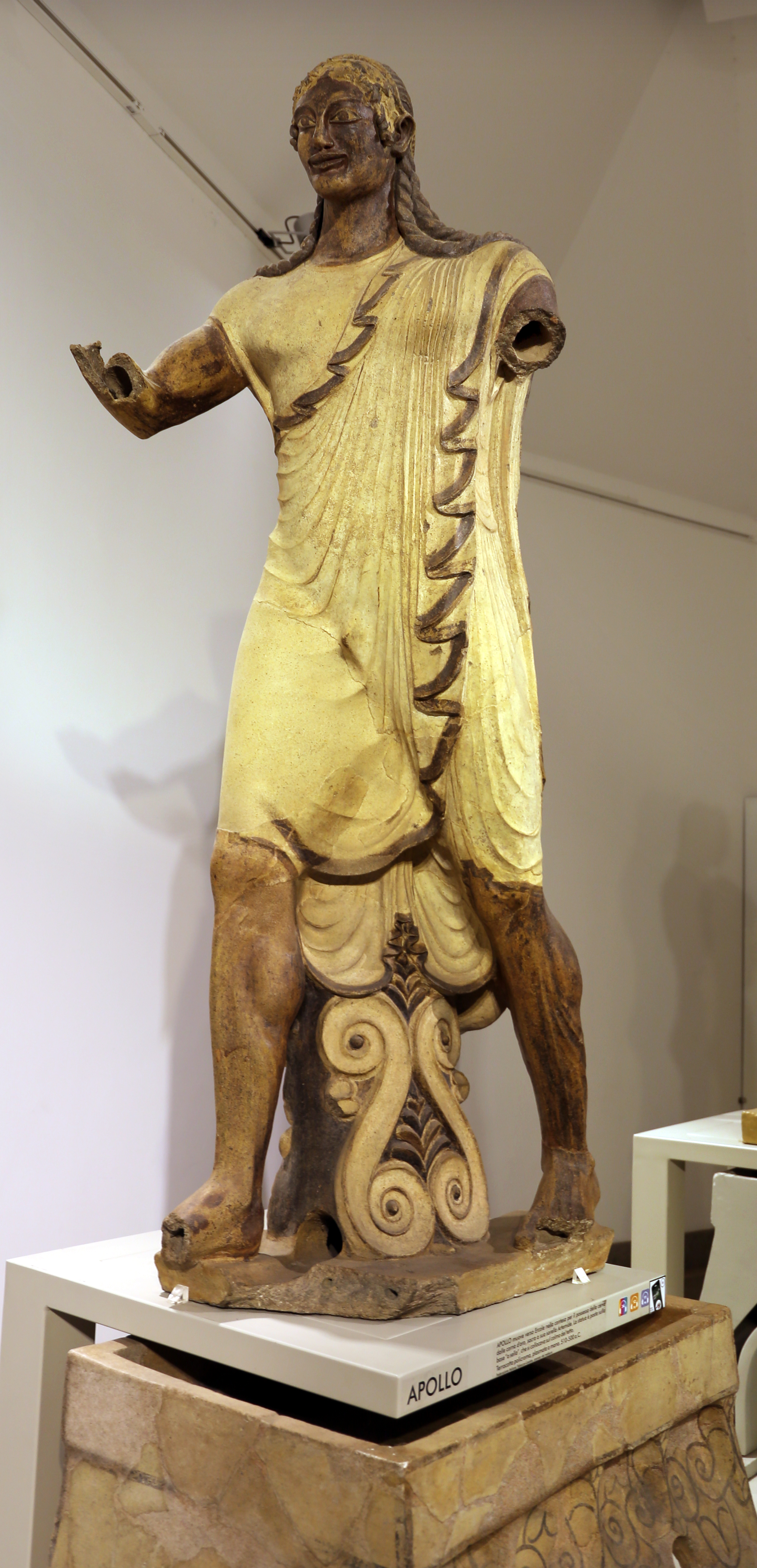
Apollo of Veii; c. 510 BC; painted terracotta; height: 1.81 m; National Etruscan Museum (Rome)

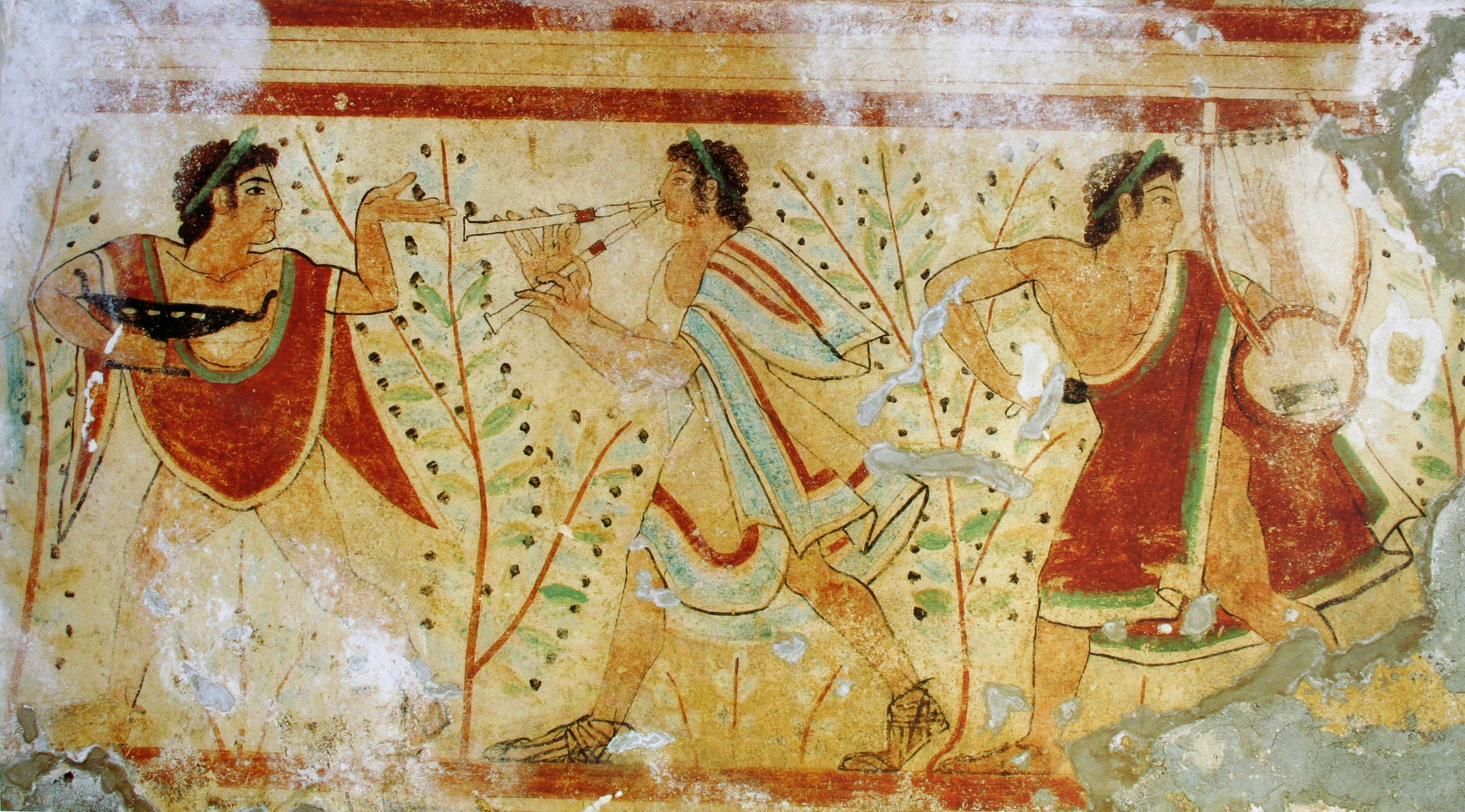
Fresco with dancers and musicians; c. 475 BC; fresco secco; height (of the wall); 1.7 m; Tomb of the Leopards (Monterozzi necropolis, Lazio, Italy)

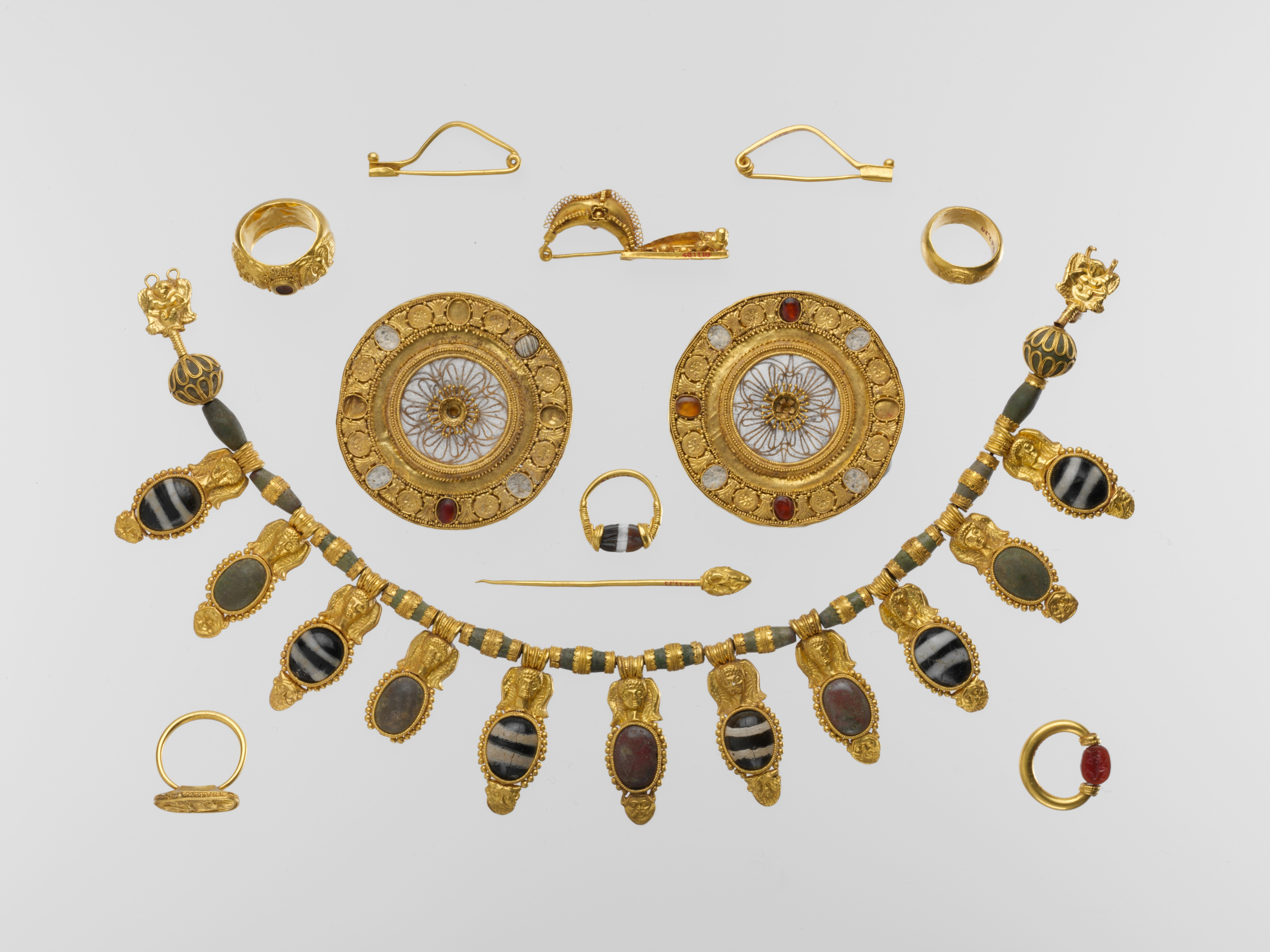
The Vulci set of jewelry; early 5th century; gold, glass, rock crystal, agate and carnelian; various dimensions; Metropolitan Museum of Art

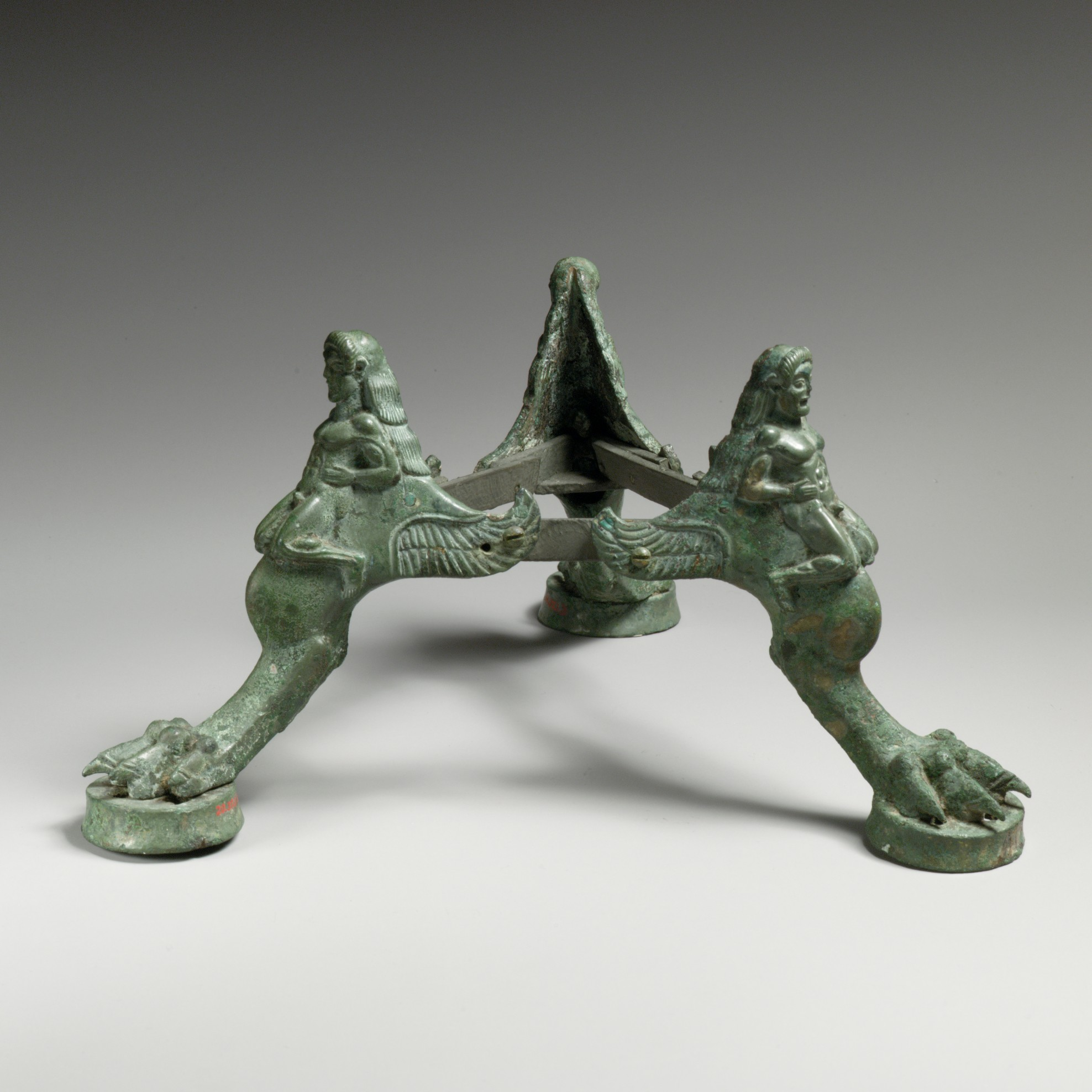
Tripod base for a thymiaterion (incense burner); 475-450 BC; bronze; height: 11 cm; Metropolitan Museum of Art

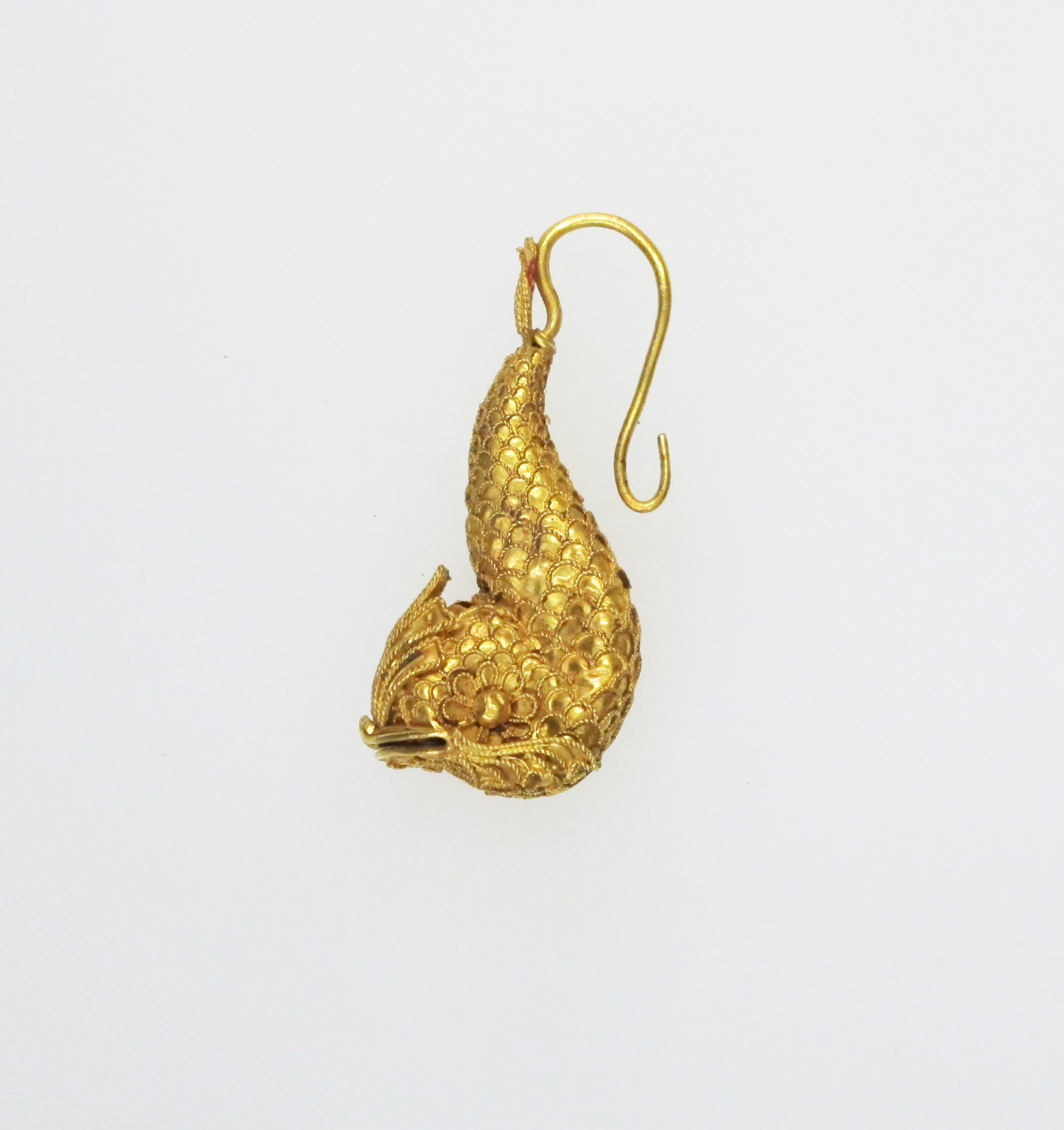
Earring in the form of a dolphin; 5th century BC; gold; 2.1 × 1.4 × 4.9 cm; Metropolitan Museum of Art

=== Greek ===
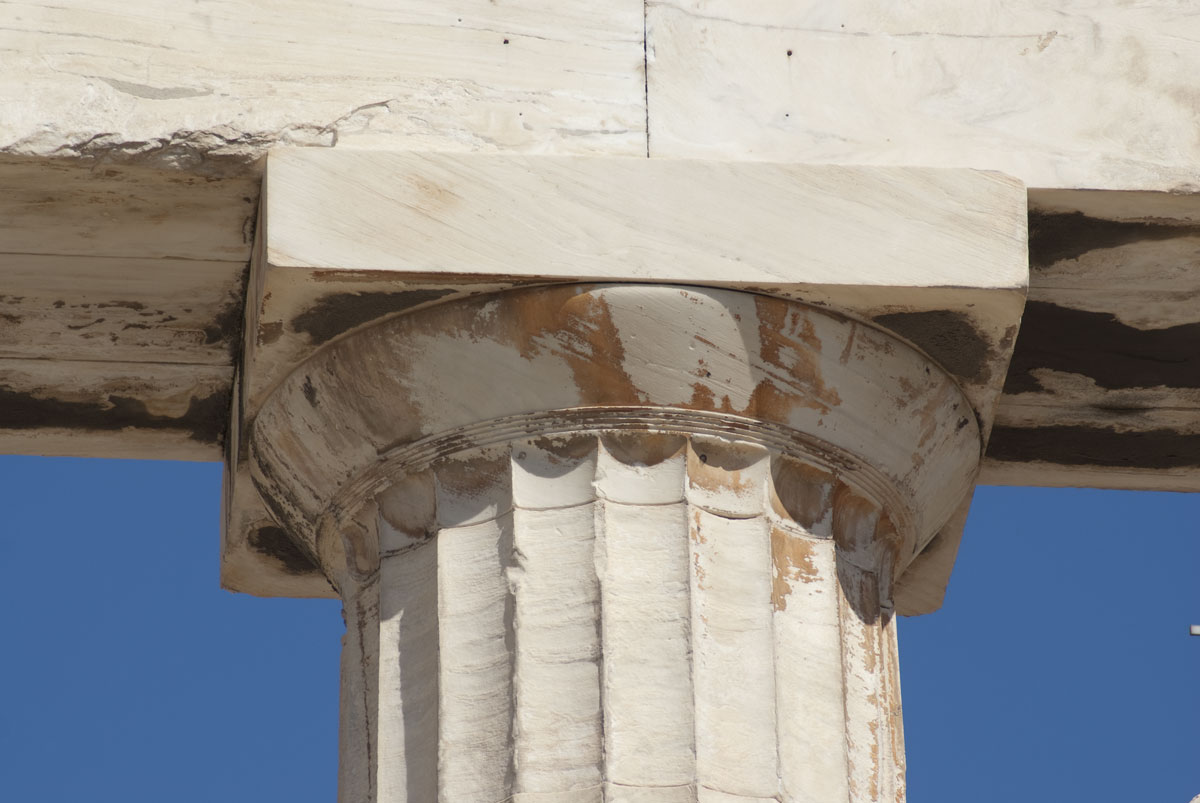
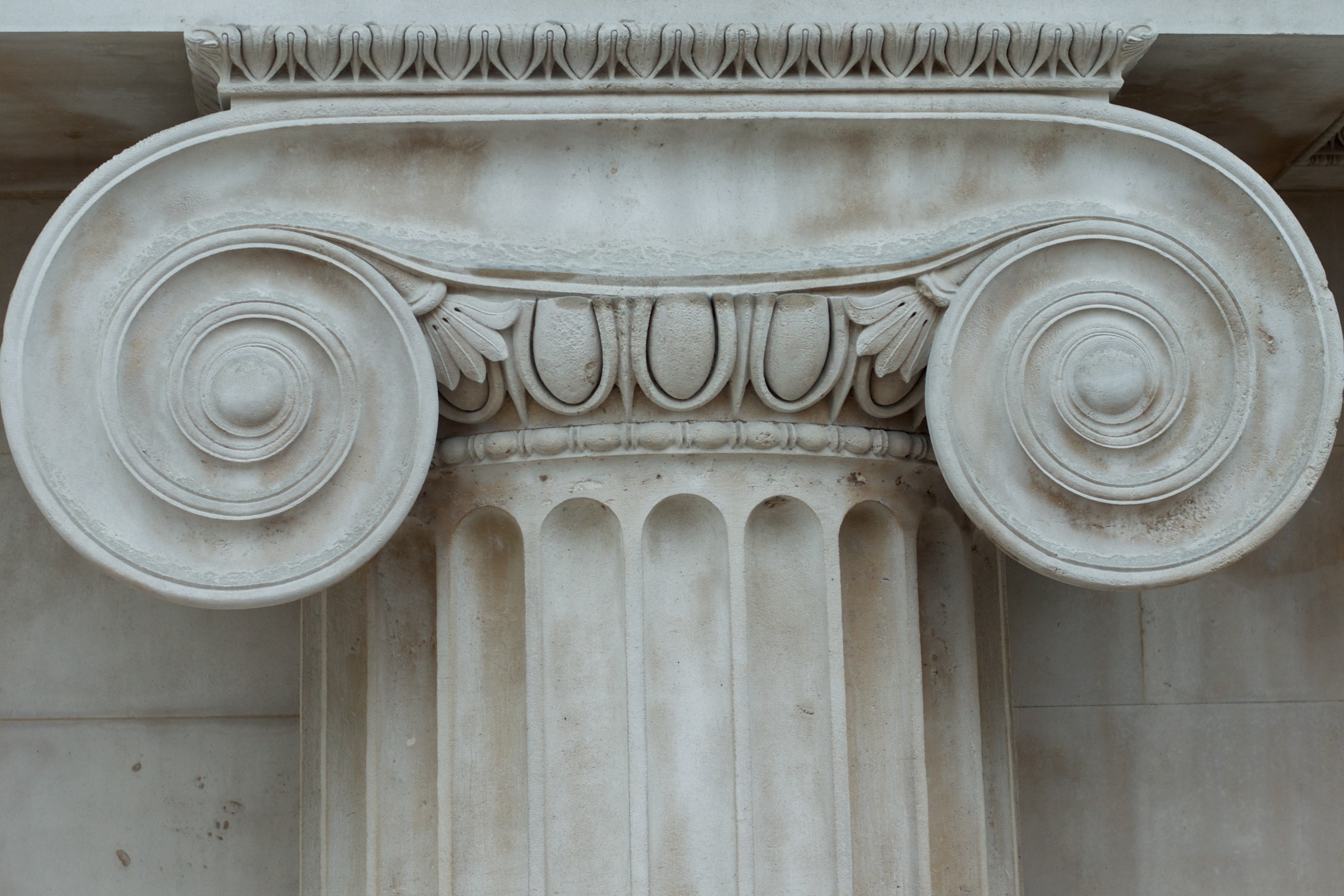
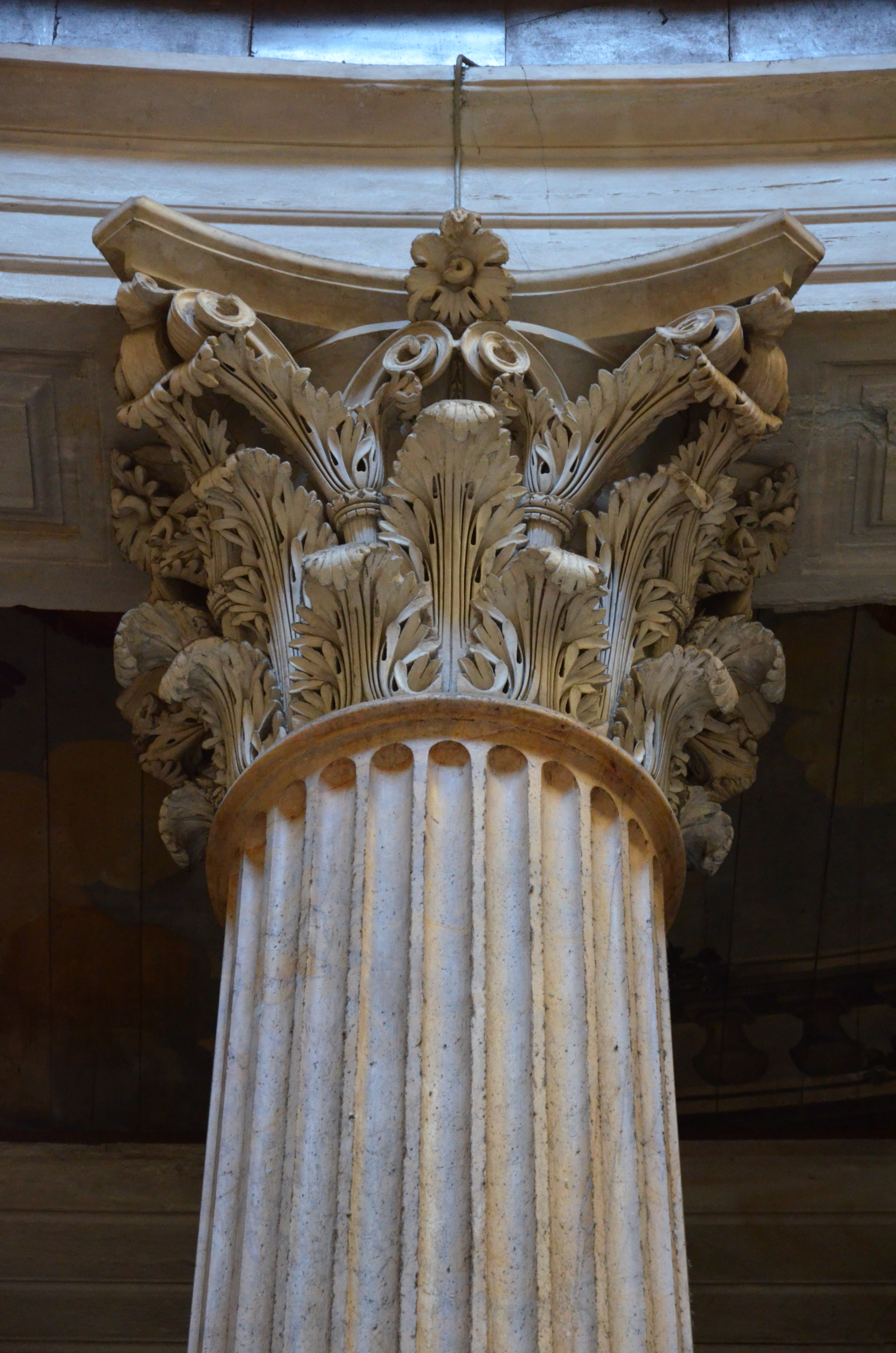
Capitals in the three Greek orders: Doric, Ionic and Corinthian

Ancient Greek art includes much pottery and sculpture, as well as architecture. Greek sculpture is known for the contrapposto standing of the figures. The art of Ancient Greece is usually divided stylistically into three periods: the Archaic, the Classical, and the Hellenistic. The history of Ancient Greek pottery is divided stylistically into periods: the Protogeometric, the Geometric, the Late Geometric or Archaic, the Black Figure, and the Red Figure. Ancient Greek art has survived most successfully in the forms of sculpture and architecture, as well as in such minor arts as coin design, pottery, and gem engraving.

The most prestigious form of Ancient Greek painting was panel painting, now known only from literary descriptions; they perished rapidly after the 4th century AD when they were no longer actively protected. Today not much survives of Greek painting, except for late mummy paintings and a few paintings on the walls of tombs, mostly in Macedonia and Italy. Painting on pottery, of which a great deal survives, gives some sense of the aesthetics of Greek painting. The techniques involved, however, were very different from those used in large-format painting. It was mainly in black and gold and was painted using different paints than the ones used on walls or wood, because it was a different surface.

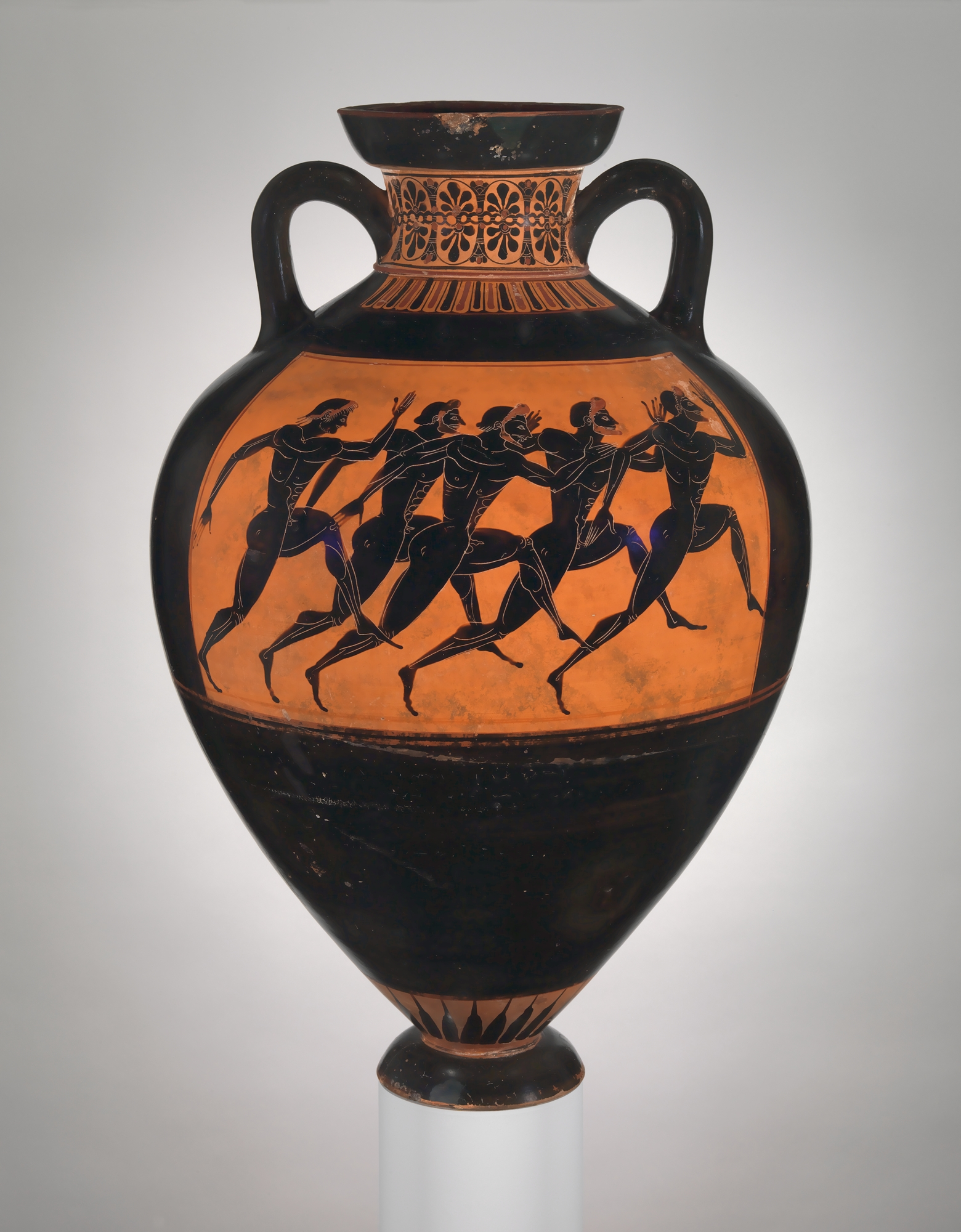
The Euphiletos Painter Panathenaic prize amphora; 530 BC; painted terracotta; height: 62.2 cm; Metropolitan Museum of Art (New York City)

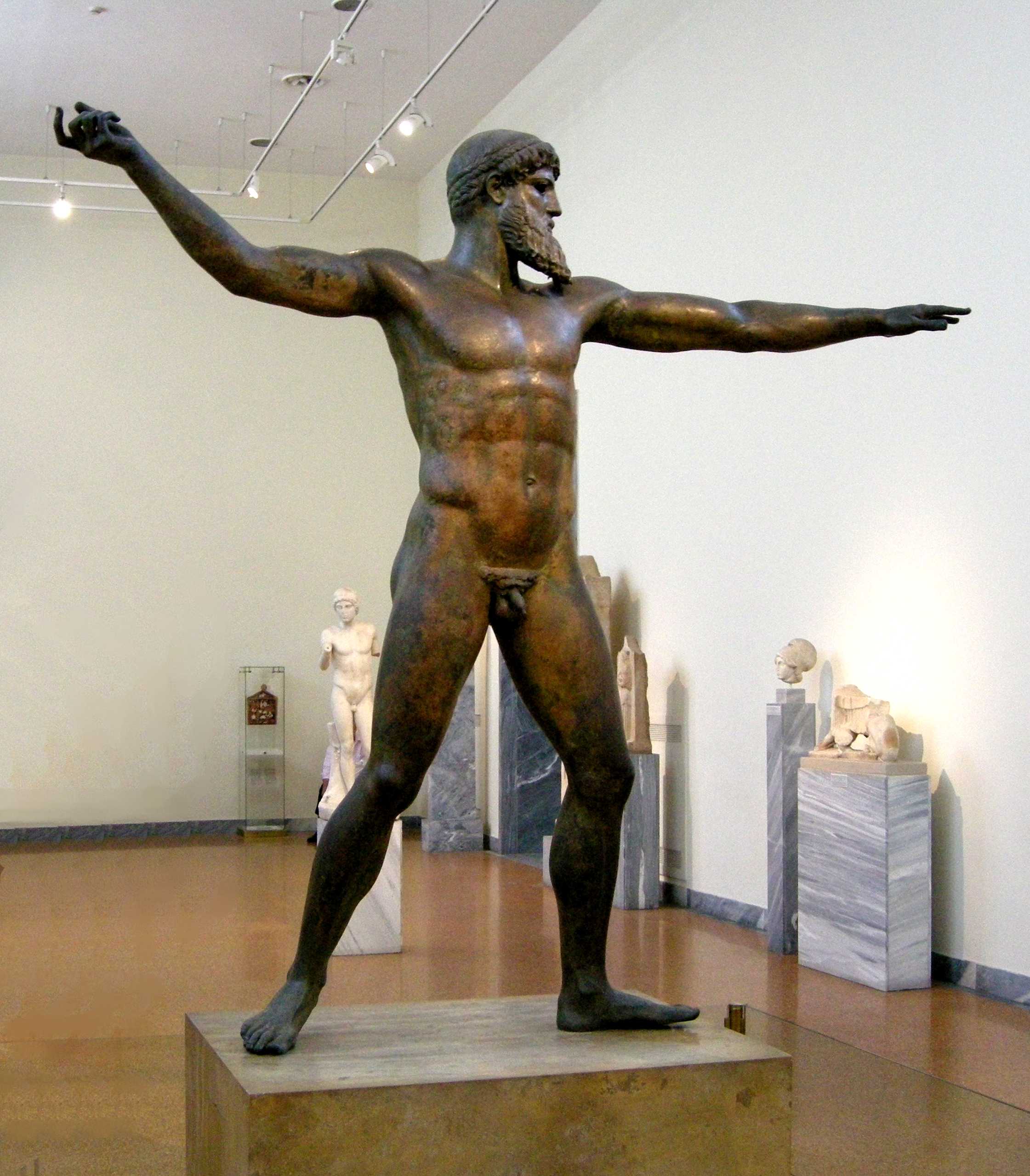
The Artemision Bronze; 460-450 BC; bronze; height: 2.1 m; National Archaeological Museum (Athens)

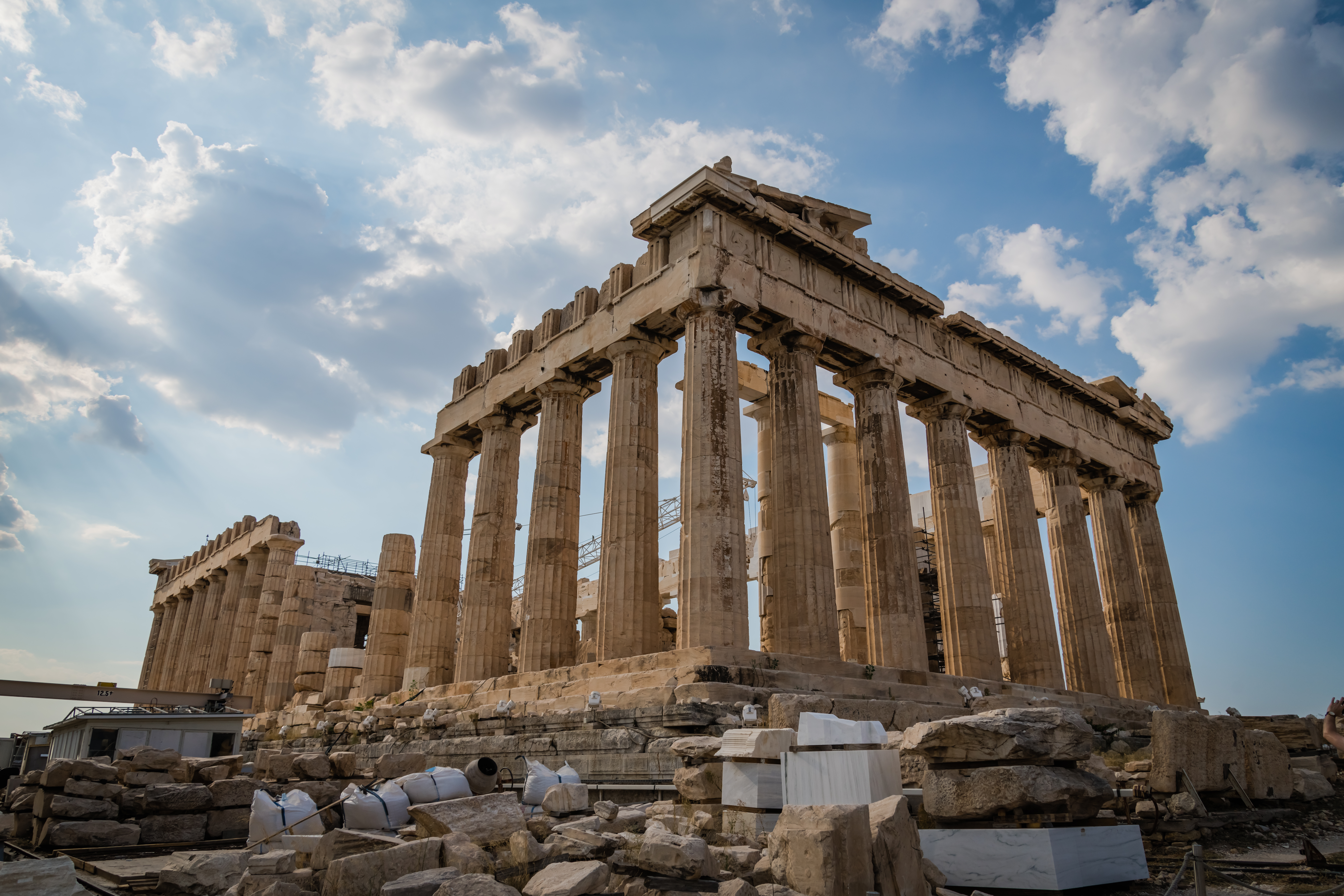
The Parthenon on the Athenian Acropolis, the most iconic Doric Greek temple built of marble and limestone between c. 460-406 BC, dedicated to the goddess Athena

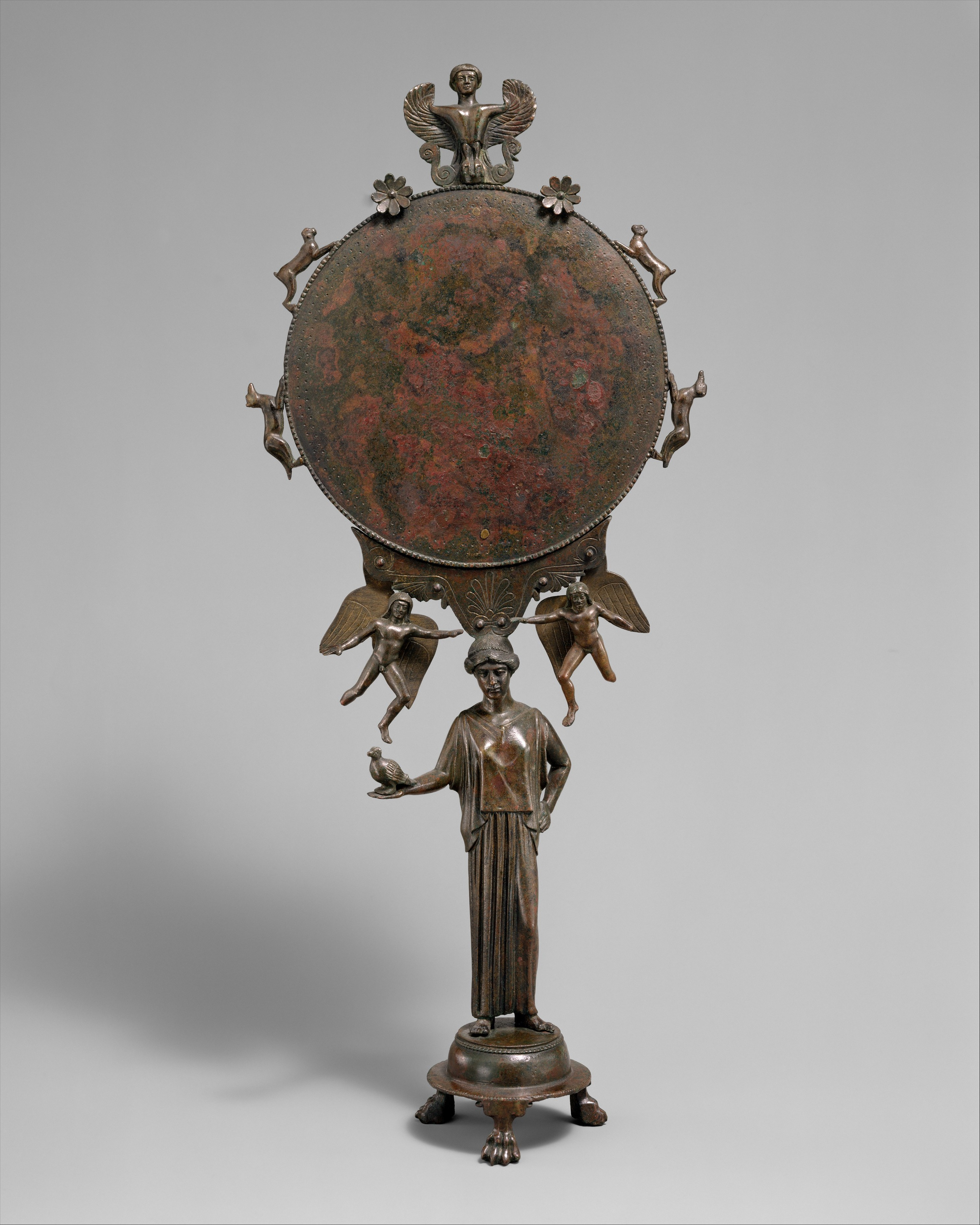
Mirror with a support in the form of a draped woman; mid-5th century BC; bronze; height: 40.41 cm; Metropolitan Museum of Art

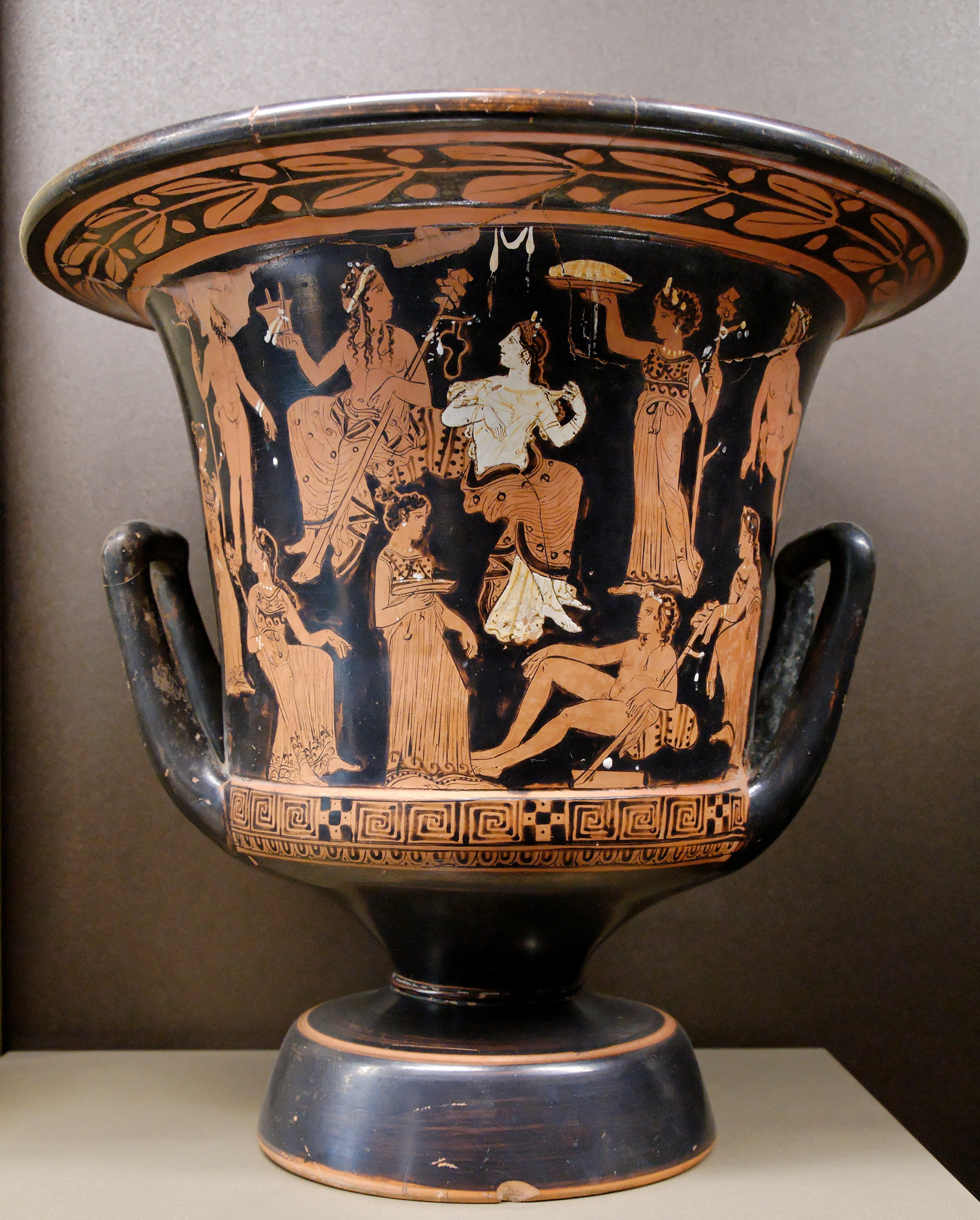
Calyx-krater; 400-375 BC; ceramic; height: 27.9 cm, diameter: 28.6 cm; from Thebes (Greece); Louvre

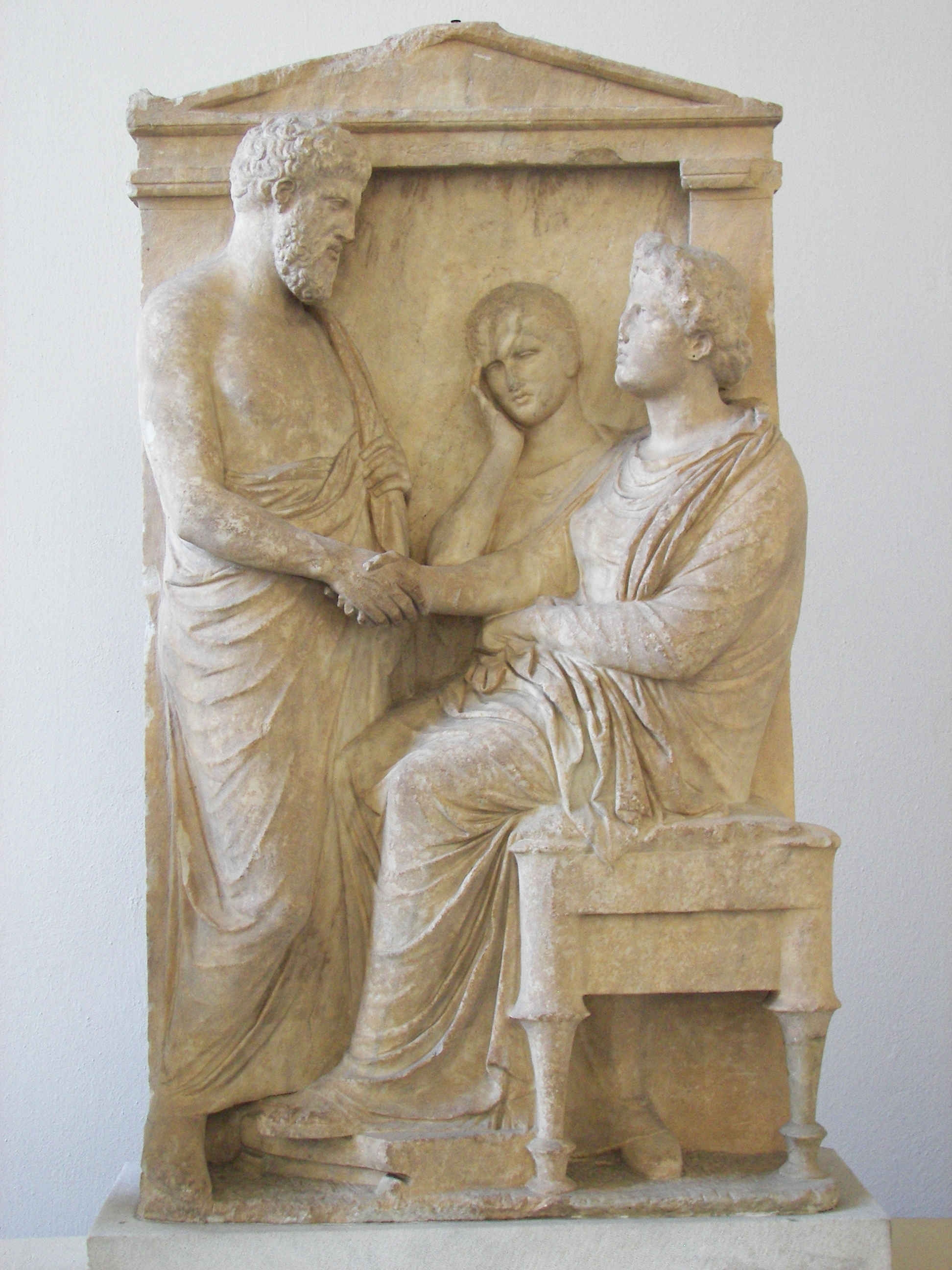
The Grave relief of Thraseas and Euandria; 375-350 BC; Pentelic marble; height: 160 cm, width: 91 cm; Pergamon Museum (Berlin)

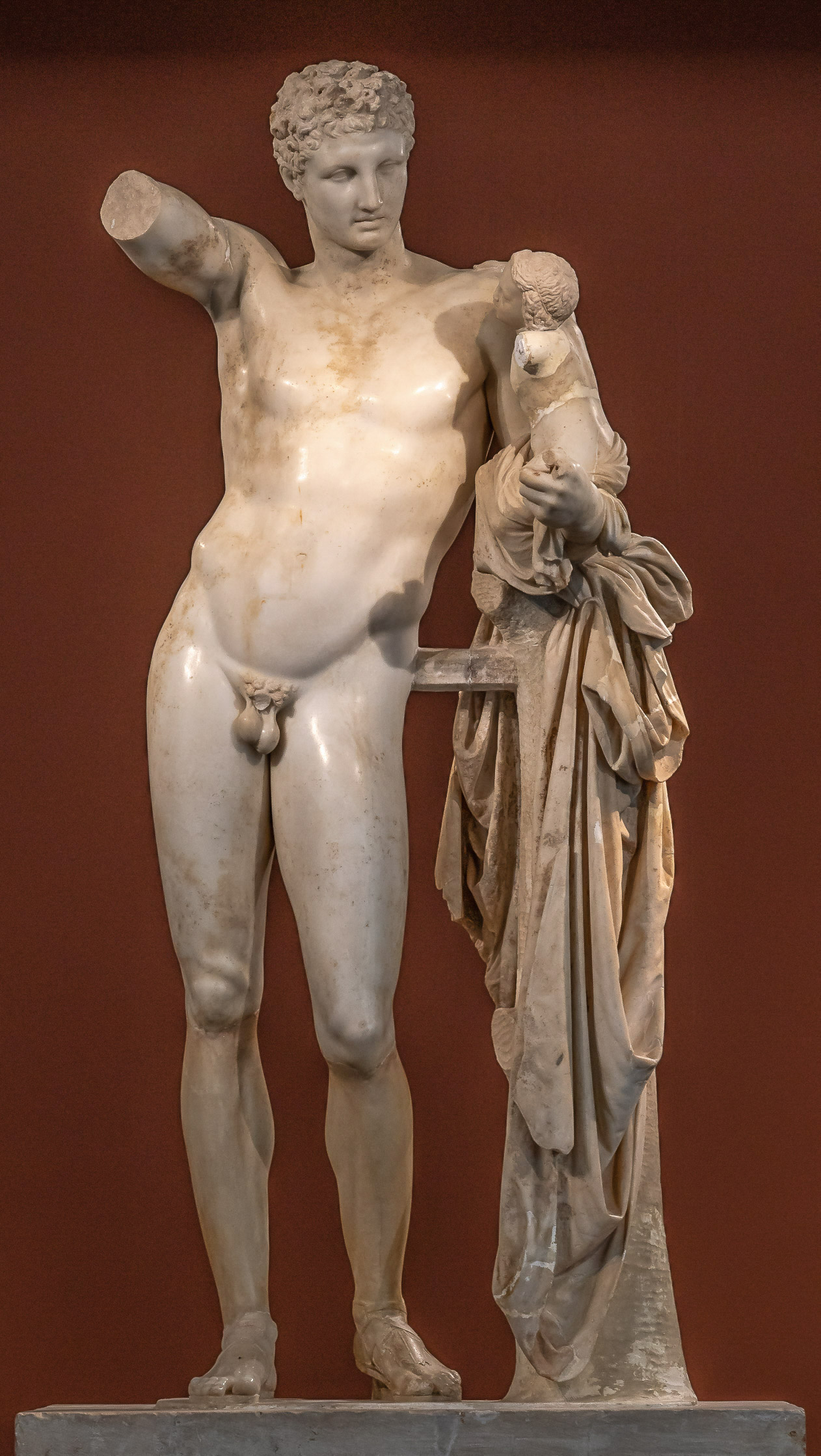
Hermes and the Infant Dionysus; by Praxiteles; 330-320 BC; marble; height: 2.15 m; Archaeological Museum of Olympia (Olympia, Greece)

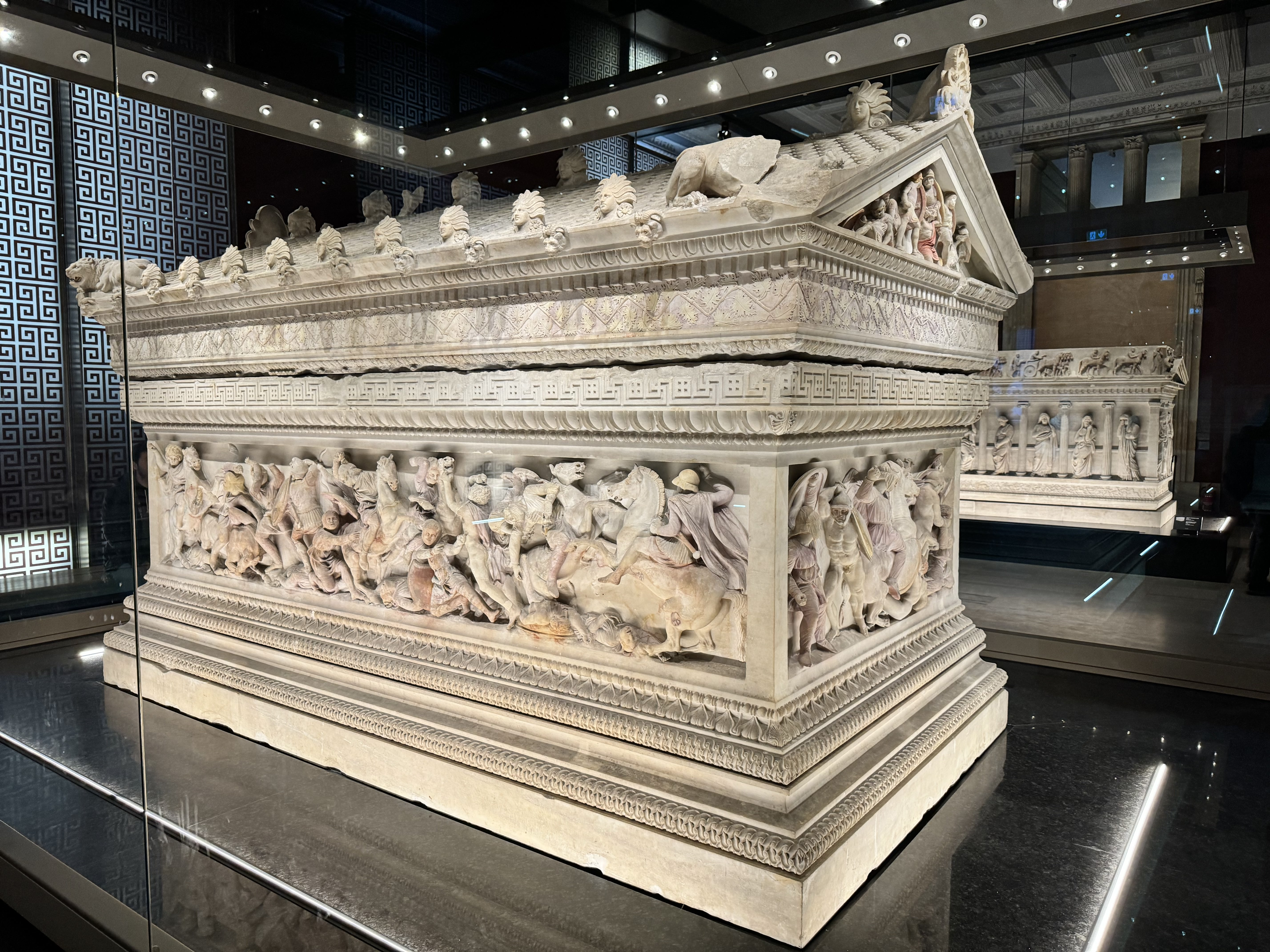
The Alexander Sarcophagus; 320–310 BC; marble; length: 3.18 m; Istanbul Archaeology Museums (Turkey)

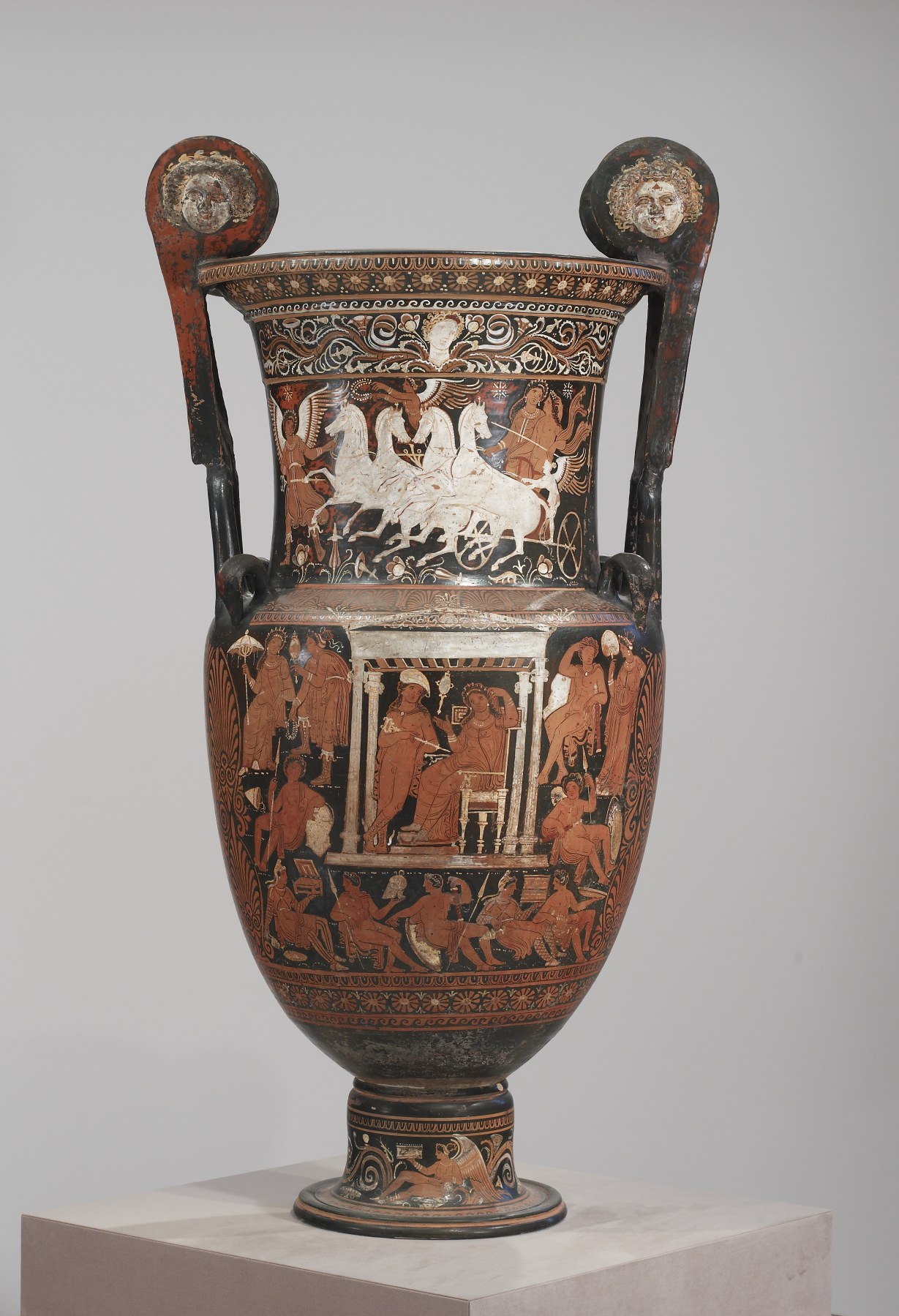
Volute krater; 320-310 BC; ceramic; height: 1.1 m; Walters Art Museum (Baltimore, US)

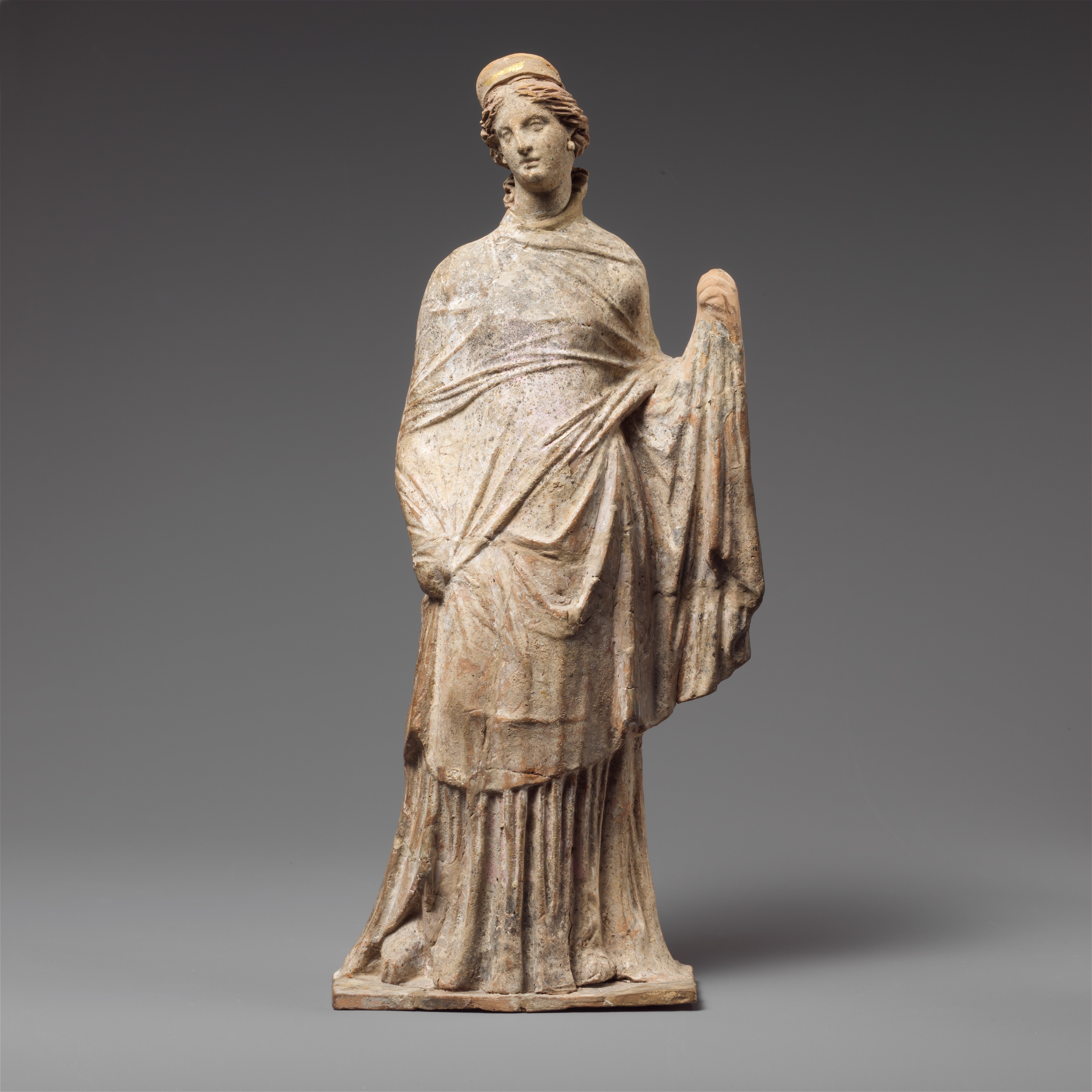
Statuette of a draped woman; 2nd century BC; terracotta; height: 29.2 cm; Metropolitan Museum of Art

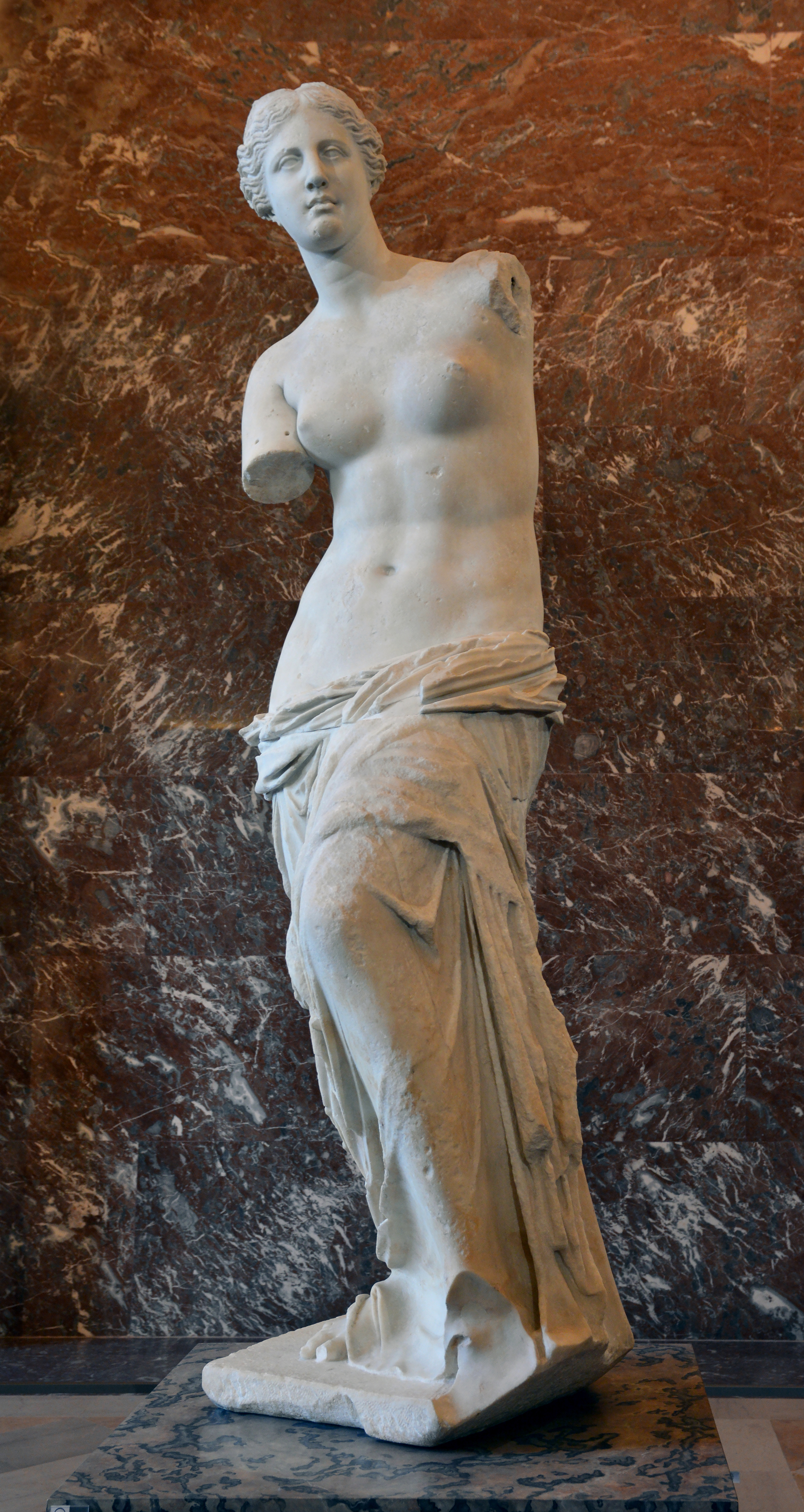
Venus de Milo; 130–100 BC; marble; height: 203 cm (80 in); Louvre

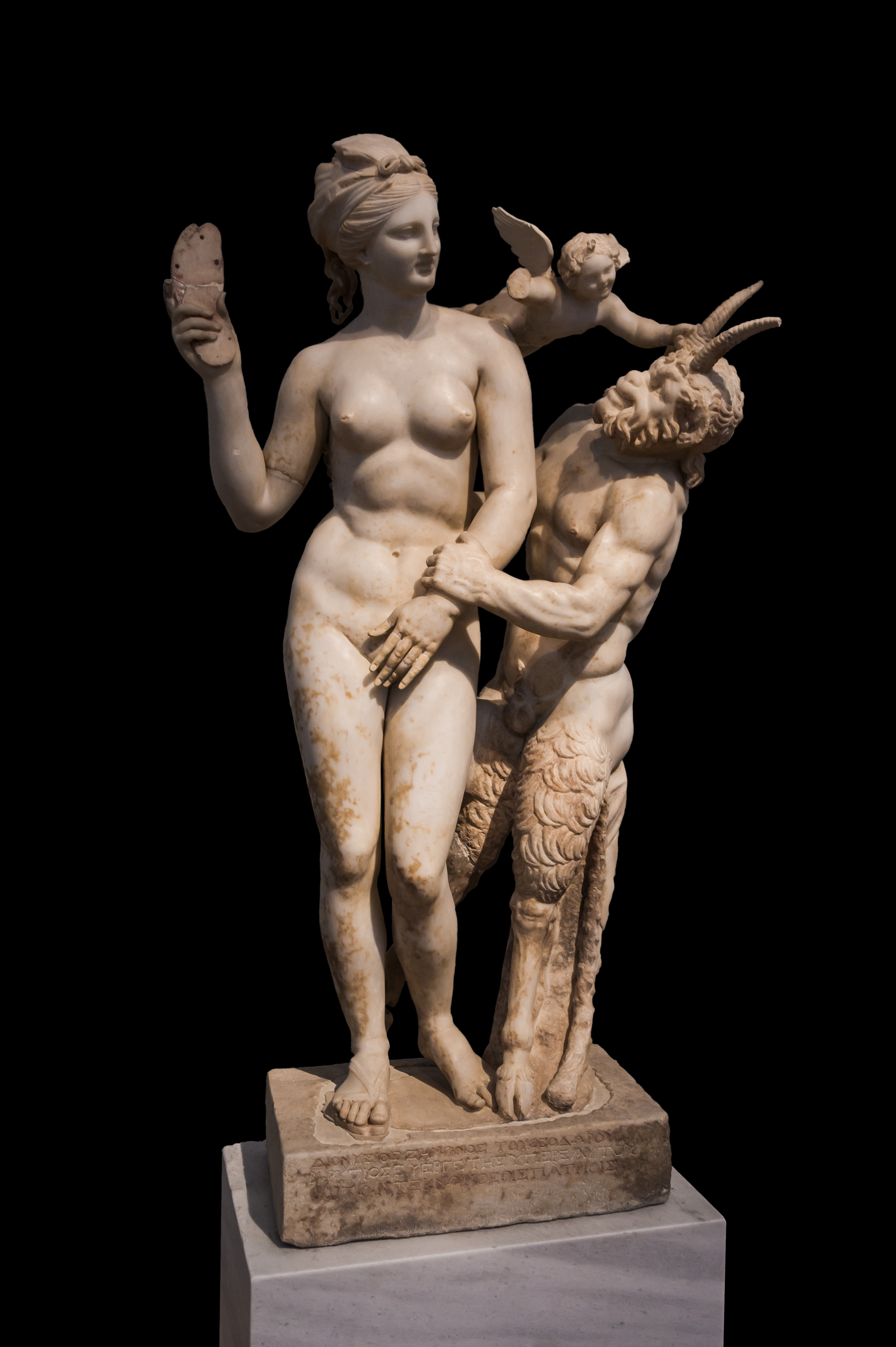
Group of Aphrodite, Pan and Eros; circa 100 BC; marble; height (without base): 1.32 m; National Archaeological Museum (Athens)

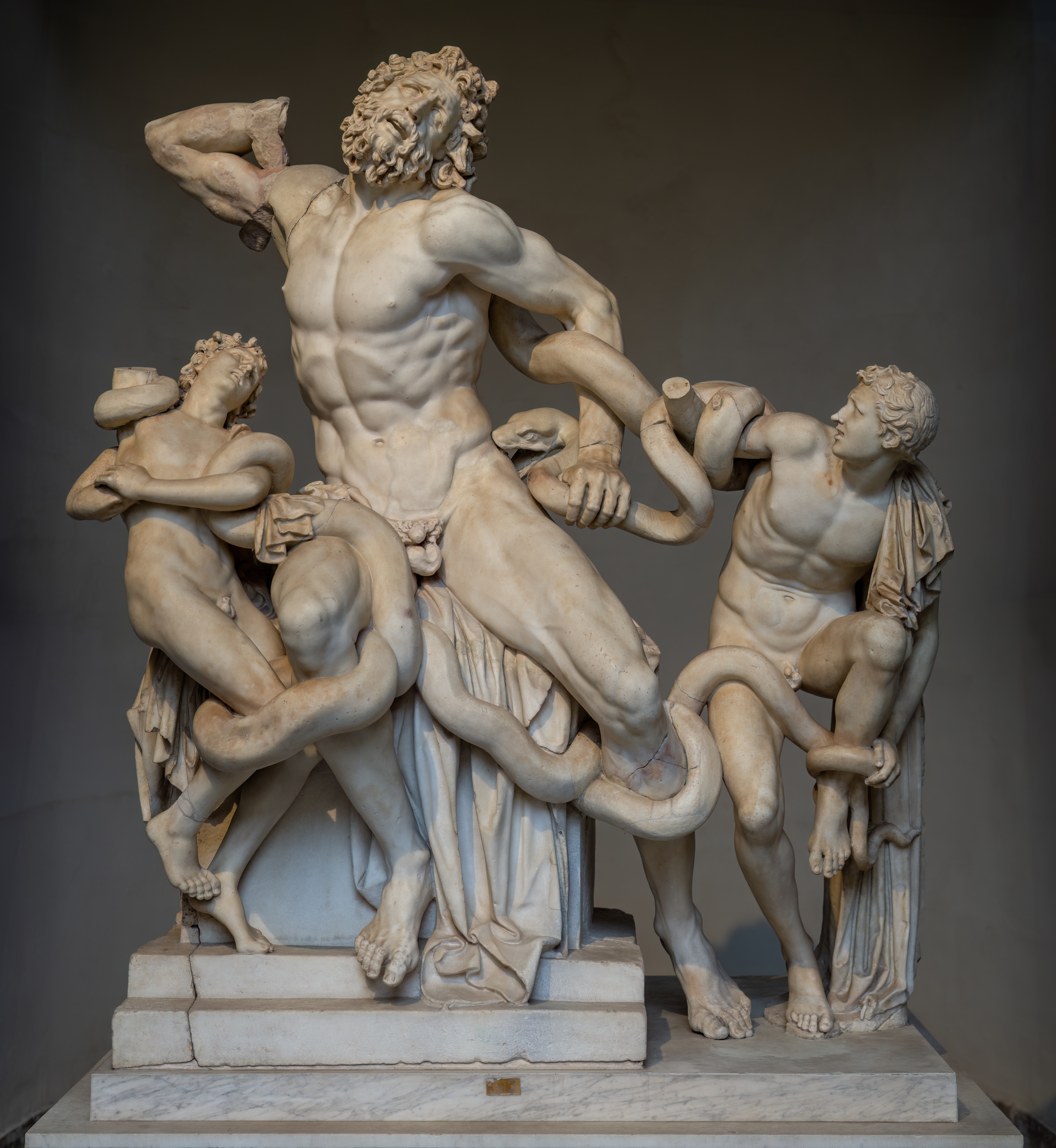
Laocoön and His Sons; early first century BC; marble; height: 2.4 m; Vatican Museums (Vatican City)

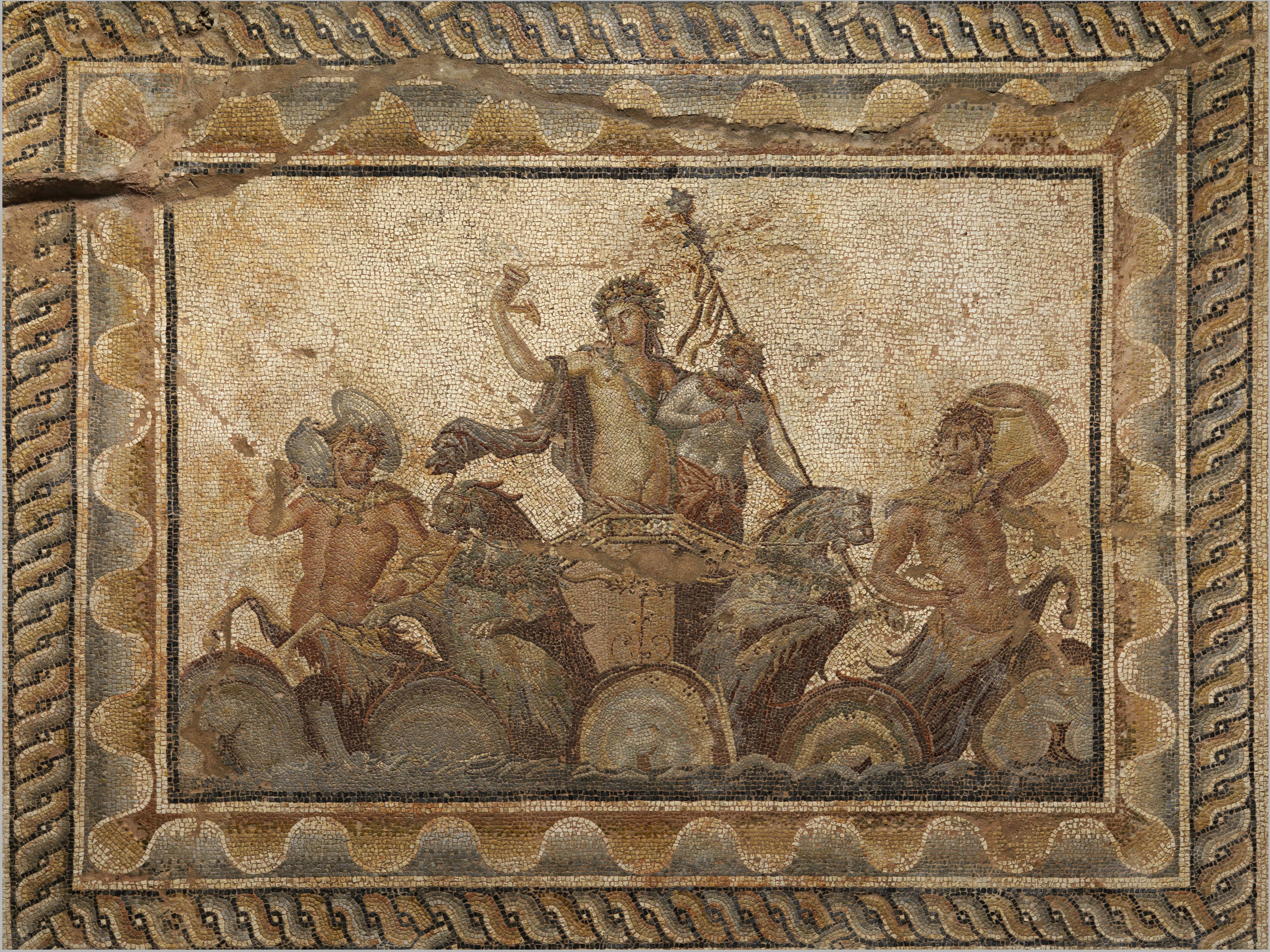
Mosaic which represents the Epiphany of Dionysus; 2nd century AD; from the Villa of Dionysus (Dion, Greece); Archeological Museum of Dion

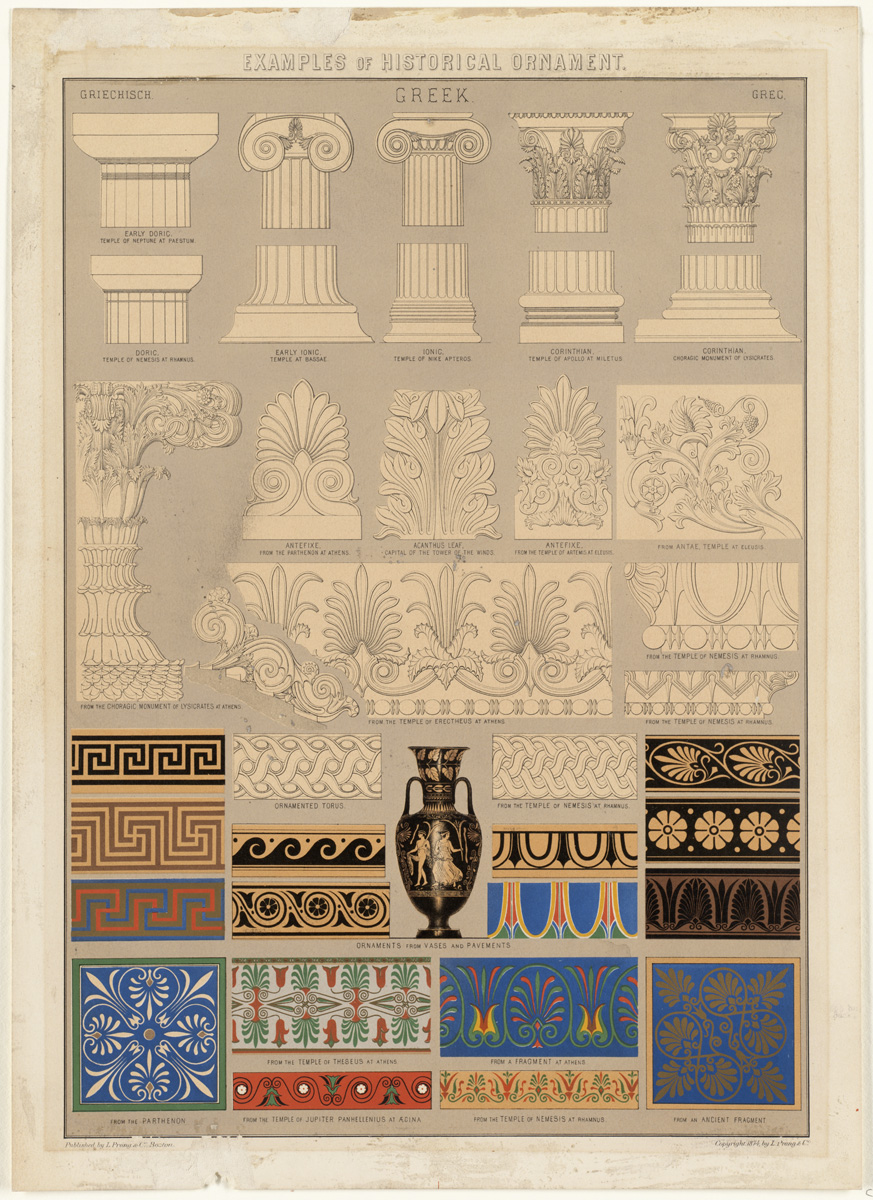
Illustrations of examples of ancient Greek ornaments and patterns, drawn in 1874

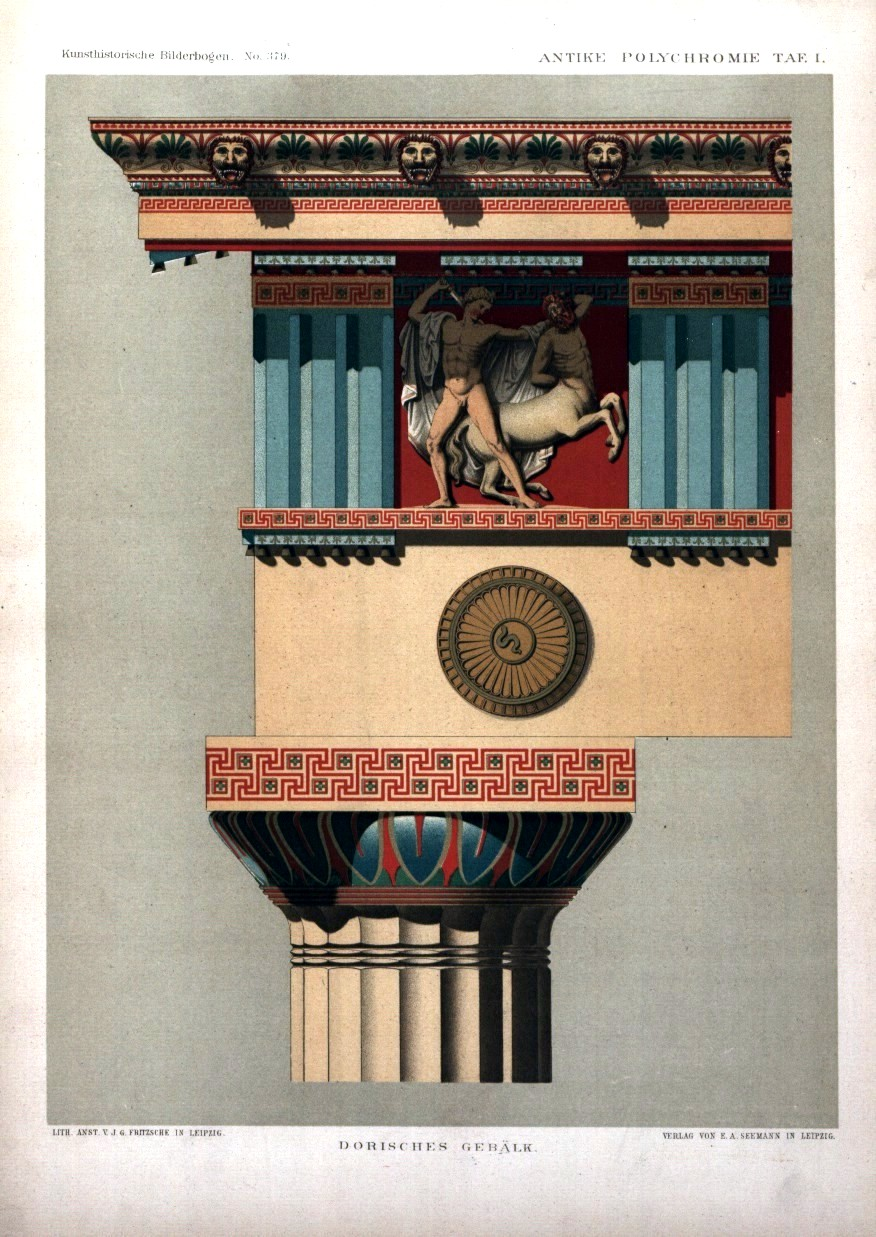
Reconstructed colour scheme of the entablature on a Doric temple, which shows that Ancient Greek temples were coloured, and not just white marble

=== Hittite ===
Hittite art was produced by the Hittite civilization in ancient Anatolia, in modern-day Turkey, and also stretching into Syria during the second millennium BC from the nineteenth century up until the twelfth century BC. This period falls under the Anatolian Bronze Age. It is characterized by a long tradition of canonized images and motifs rearranged, while still being recognizable, by artists to convey meaning to a largely illiterate population.

"Owing to the limited vocabulary of figural types [and motifs], invention for the Hittite artist usually was a matter of combining and manipulating the units to form more complex compositions"

Many of these recurring images revolve around the depiction of Hittite deities and ritual practices. There is also a prevalence of hunting scenes in Hittite relief and representational animal forms. Much of the art comes from settlements like Alaca Höyük, or the Hittite capital of Hattusa near modern-day Boğazkale. Scholars do have difficulty dating a large portion of Hittite art, citing the fact that there is a lack of inscription and much of the found material, especially from burial sites, was moved from their original locations and distributed among museums during the nineteenth century.

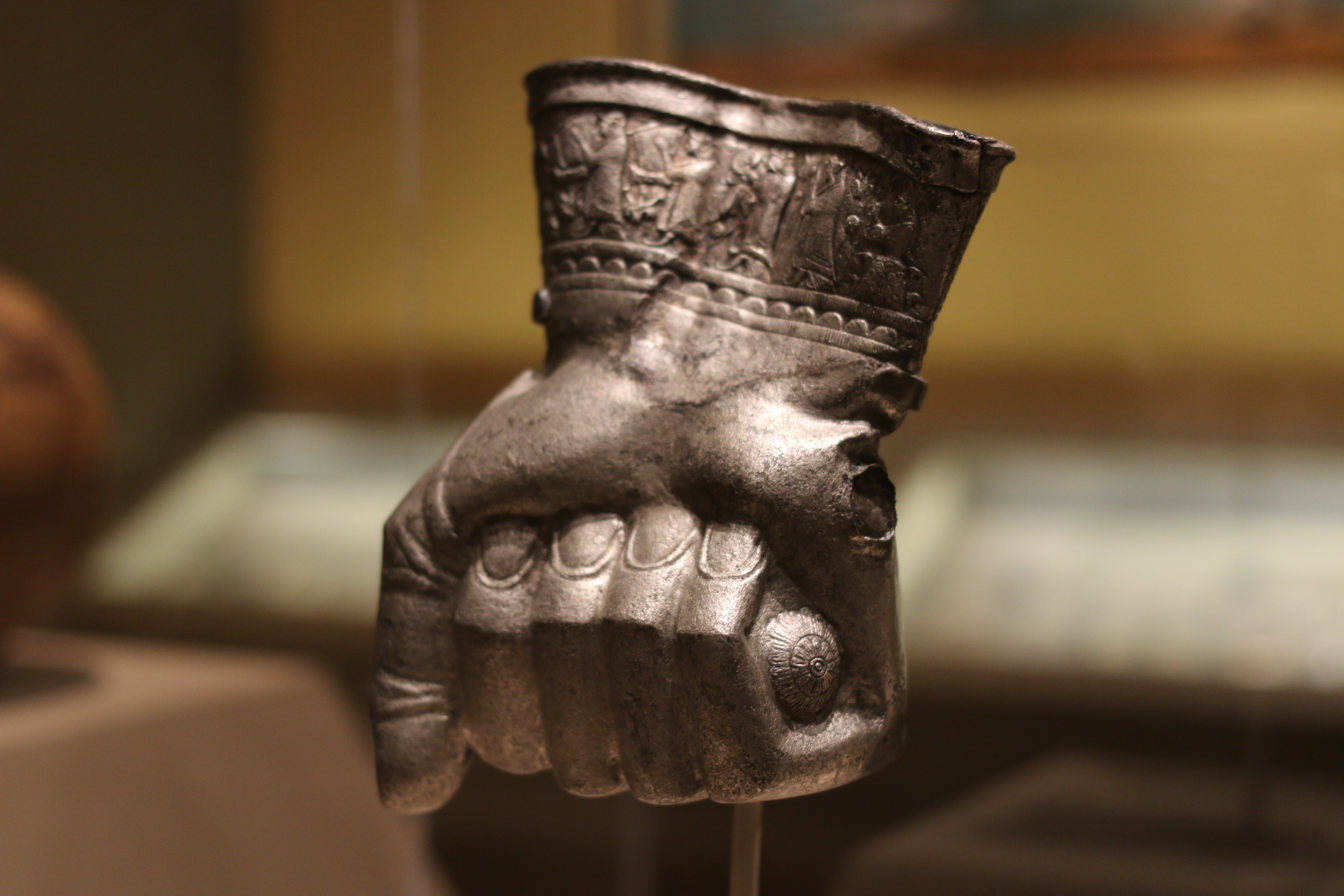
Drinking cup in the shape of a fist; 1400–1380 BC; silver; from Central Turkey; Museum of Fine Arts (Boston, US)

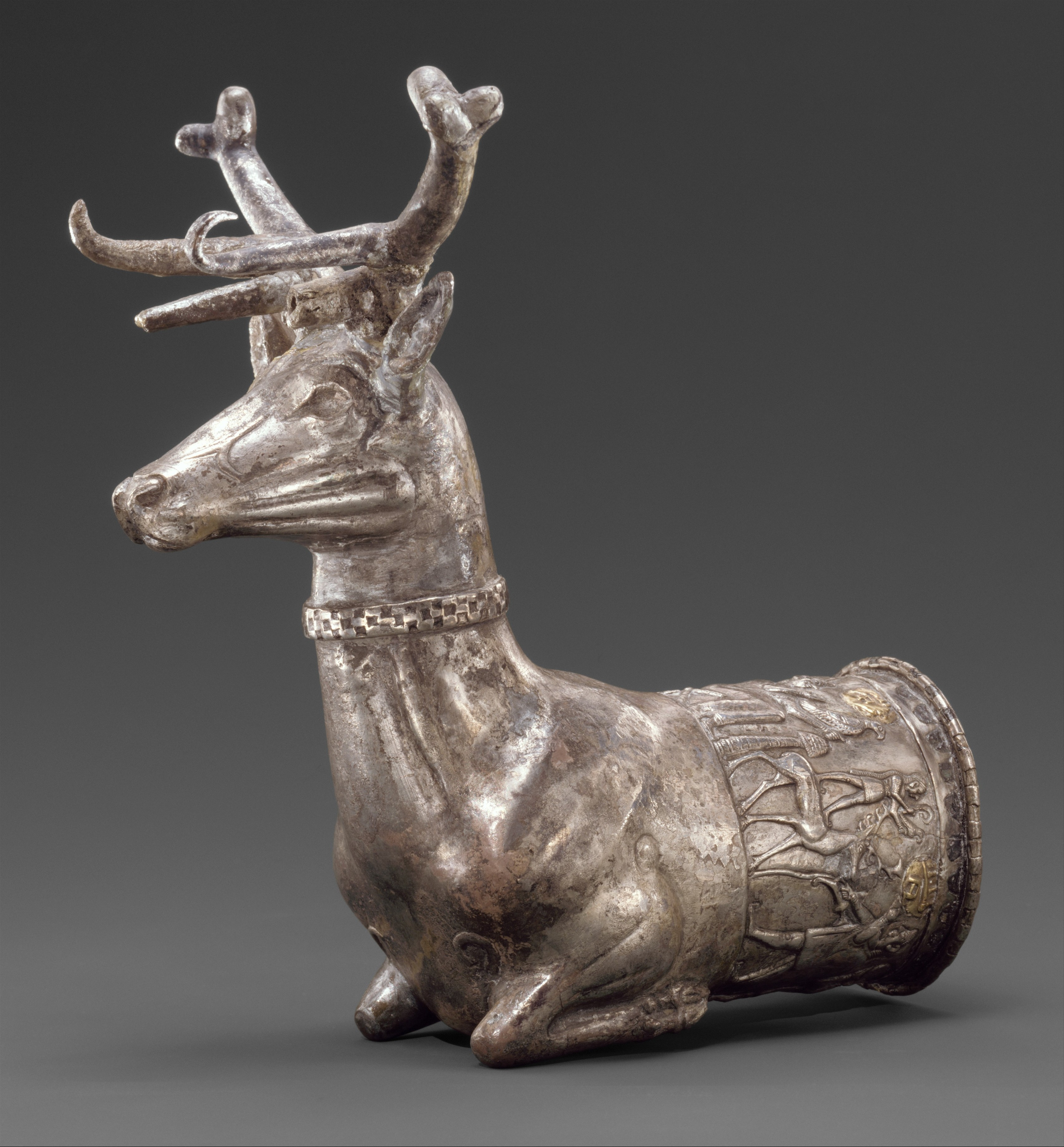
Vessel terminating in the forepart of a stag; c. 14th–13th century BC; silver with gold inlay; height: 18 cm; Metropolitan Museum of Art (New York City)

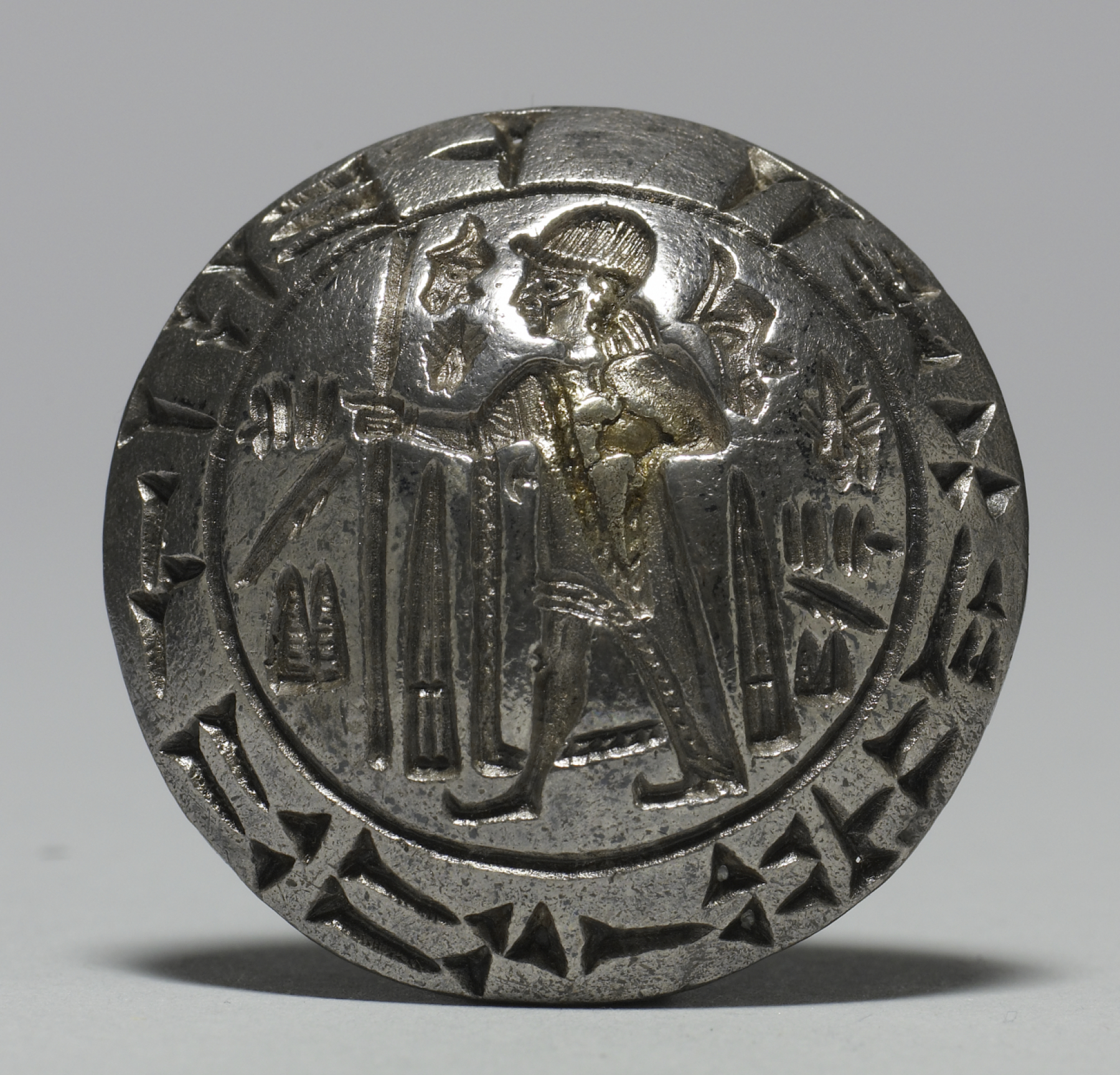
Seal of Tarkasnawa, King of Mira; circa 1220 BC; silver; height: 1 cm, diameter: 4.2 cm; Walters Art Museum (Baltimore, US)

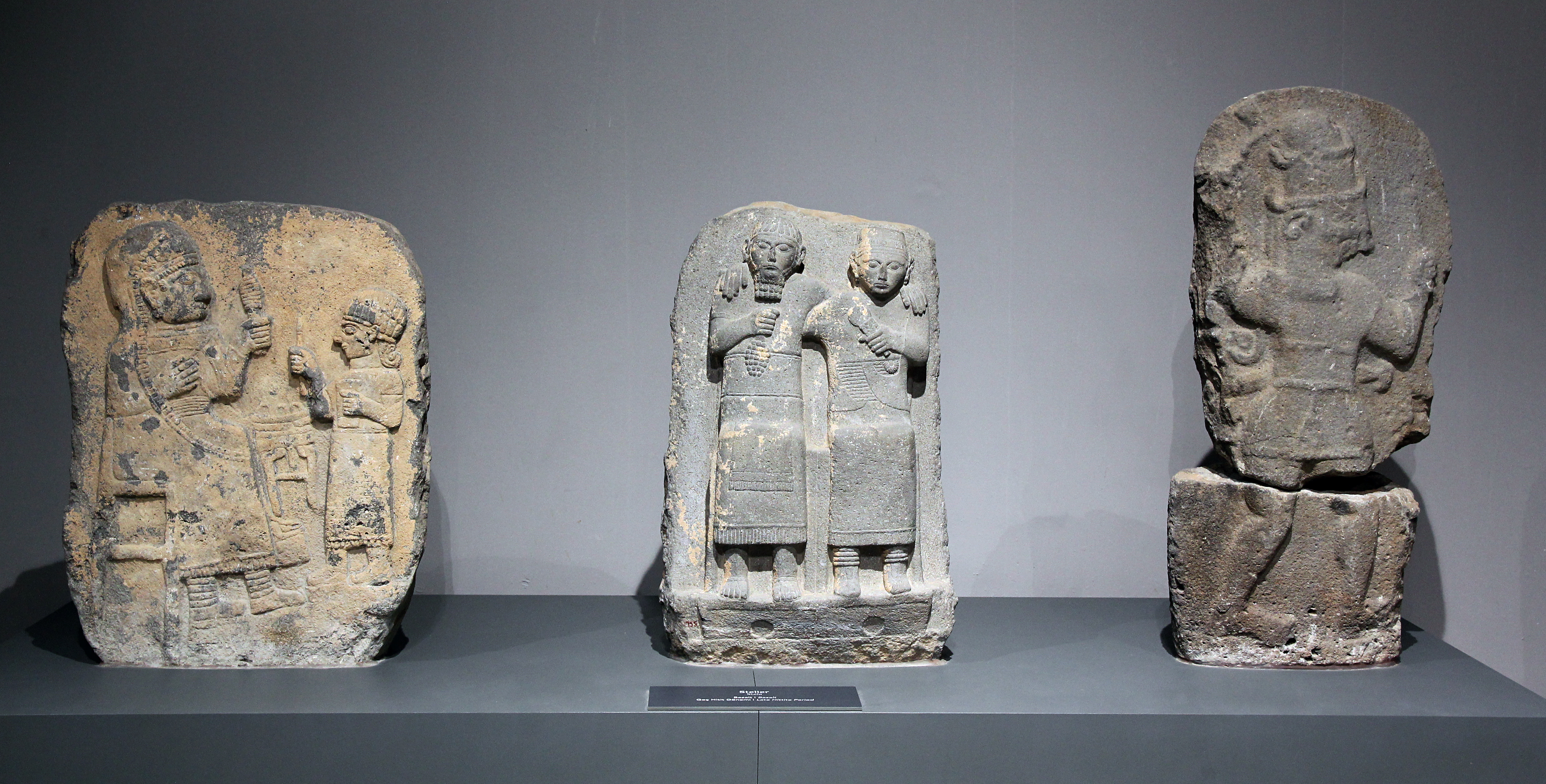
Three reliefs from the Adana Archaeology Museum (Turkey)

=== Mesopotamian ===
Mesopotamia (from the Greek Μεσοποταμία "[land] between the rivers", in Syriac called ܒܝܬ ܢܗܪܝܢ pronounced "Beth Nahrain", "Land of rivers", rendered in Arabic as بلاد الرافدين bilād al-rāfidayn) is a toponym for the area of the Tigris-Euphrates river system, largely corresponding to modern-day Iraq, as well as some parts of northeastern Syria, southeastern Turkey, and southwestern Iran. Within its boundaries, some of the most ancient civilizations known first developed writing and agriculture. Many civilizations flourished there, leaving behind a rich legacy of ancient art.

Bronze Age Mesopotamian civilizations included the Akkadian, Babylonian, and Assyrian empires, and Sumer. In the Iron Age, Mesopotamia was ruled by the Neo-Assyrian and Neo-Babylonian empires. The indigenous Sumerians and Akkadians (including Assyrians & Babylonians) dominated Mesopotamia from the beginning of written history (c. 3100 BC) to the fall of Babylon in 539 BC, when it was conquered by the Achaemenid Empire. It fell to Alexander the Great in 332 BC and after his death, it became part of the Greek Seleucid Empire.

Around 150 BC, Mesopotamia was under the control of the Parthians. Mesopotamia became a battleground between the Romans and Parthians, with parts of Mesopotamia (particularly Assyria) coming under periodic Roman control. In 226 AD, it fell to the Sassanid Persians and remained under Persian rule until the 7th-century Arab Islamic conquest of the Sassanid Empire. A number of primarily Christian native Mesopotamian states existed between the 1st century BC and the 3rd century AD, including Adiabene, Oshroene, and Hatra.

==== Assyrian ====
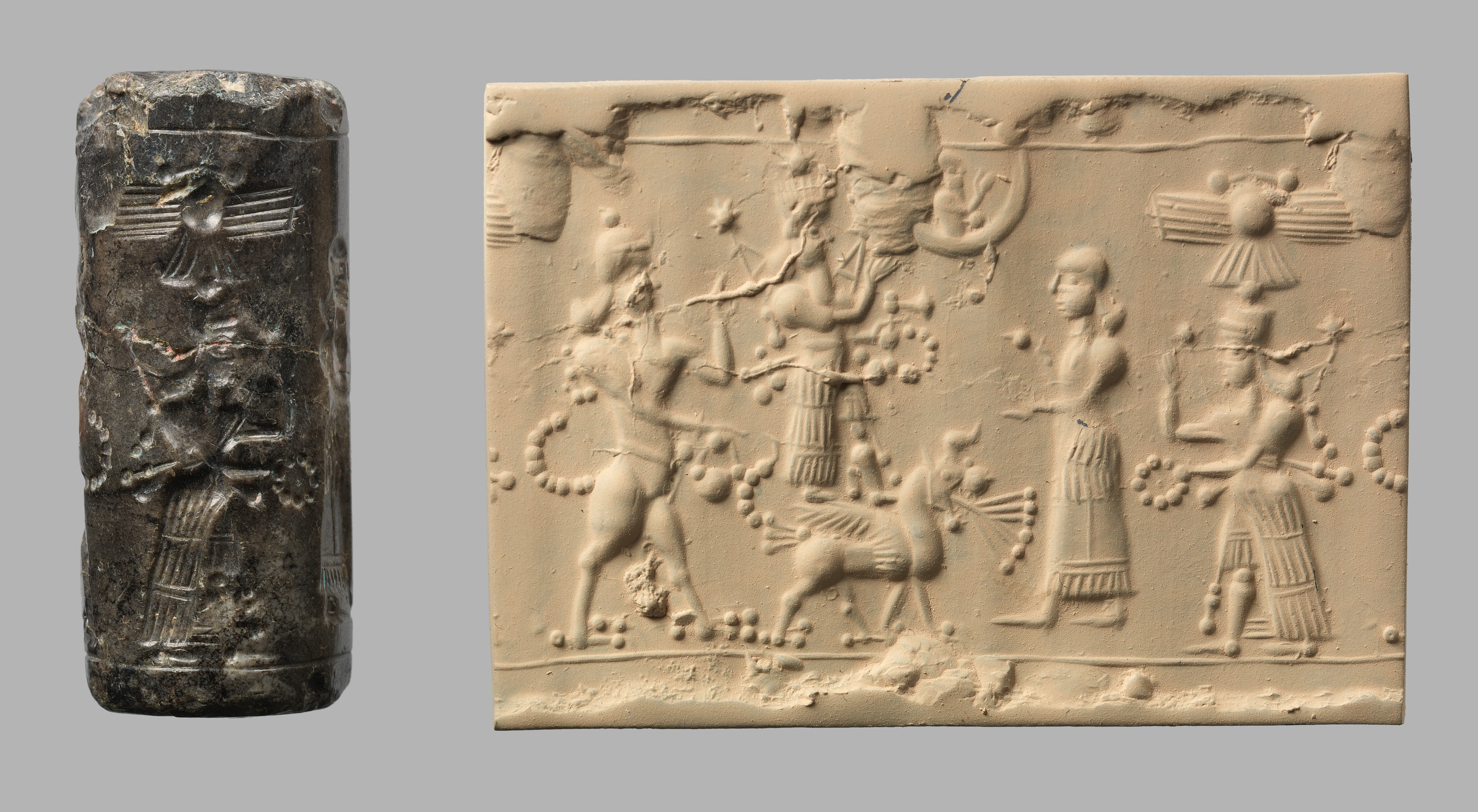
Cylinder seal with deities, one of them being on a winged lion; 8th–7th century BC; cryptocrystalline quartz; 4.09 cm; Metropolitan Museum of Art (New York City)

When Babylon began to decline, it was conquered by Assyria, one of its former colonies. Assyria inherited its arts as well as its empire.

At first, Assyrian architects and artists copied Babylonian styles and materials. Later, Assyrians began to shake themselves free of Babylonian influences. The walls of the Assyrian palaces were lined with slabs of stone instead of brick and were colored instead of painted as in Chaldea. In place of the bas relief, we have sculpted figures, the earliest examples being the statues from Girsu.

No remarkable specimens of metallurgic art from early Assyria have been found, but at a later epoch, great excellence was attained in the manufacture of such jewellery as earrings and bracelets of gold. They also had skilled works using copper.

Assyrian pottery and porcelain were graceful. Transparent glass seems to have been first introduced in the reign of Sargon II, like the glass discovered in the palaces of Nineveh – derived from Egyptian originals. Stone, as well as clay and glass, were employed in the manufacture of vases. Vases of hard stone have been disinterred at Tello, similar to those of the early dynastic period of Egypt.

Ashurbanipal promoted art and culture and had a vast library of cuneiform tablets at Nineveh.

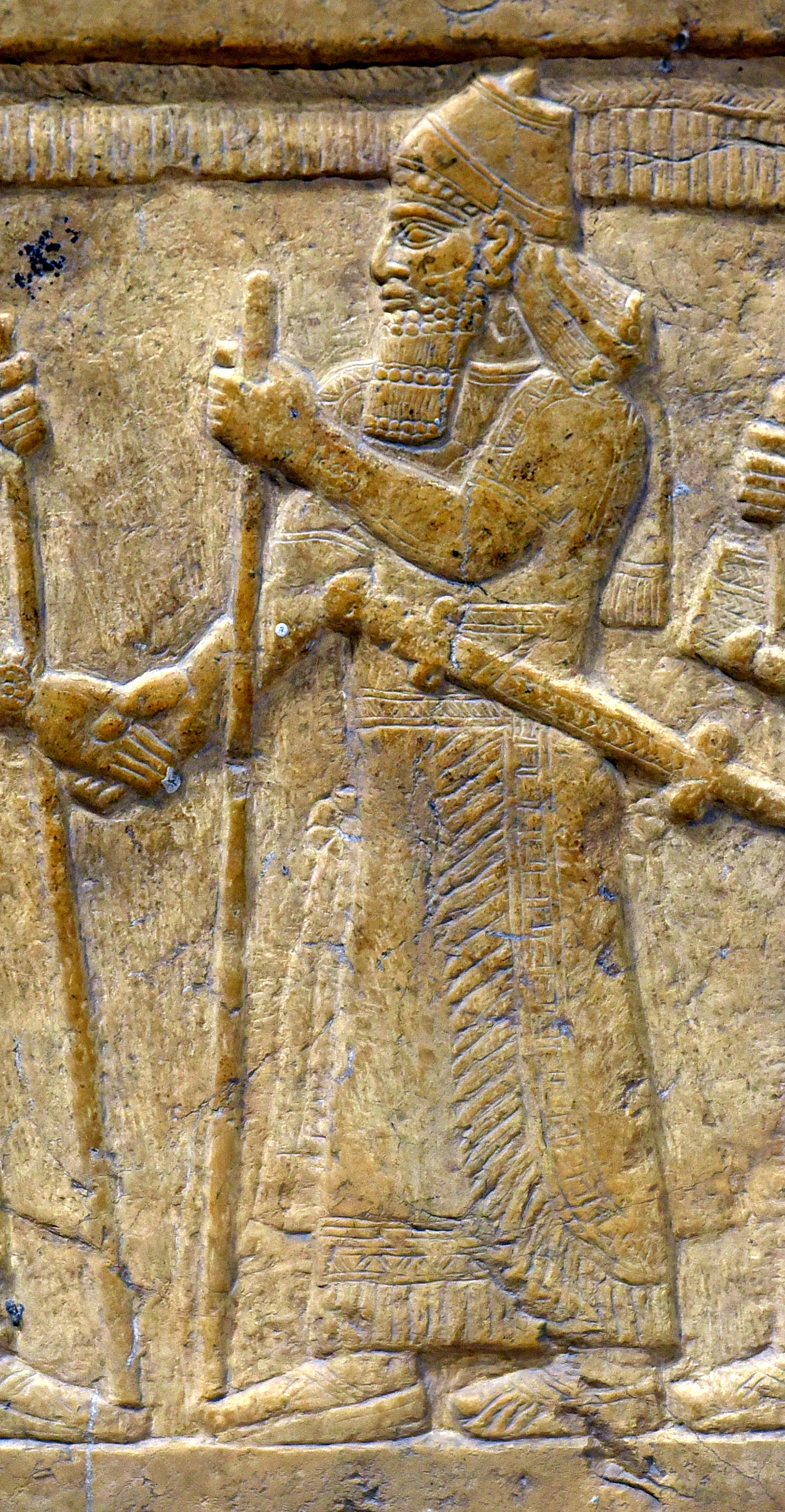
Shalmaneser III, on the Throne Dais of Shalmaneser III at the Iraq Museum.

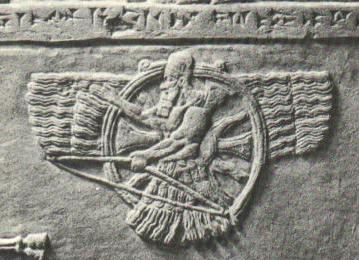
A Neo-Assyrian relief of Ashur as a feather robed archer holding a bow instead of a ring (9th–8th century BC)

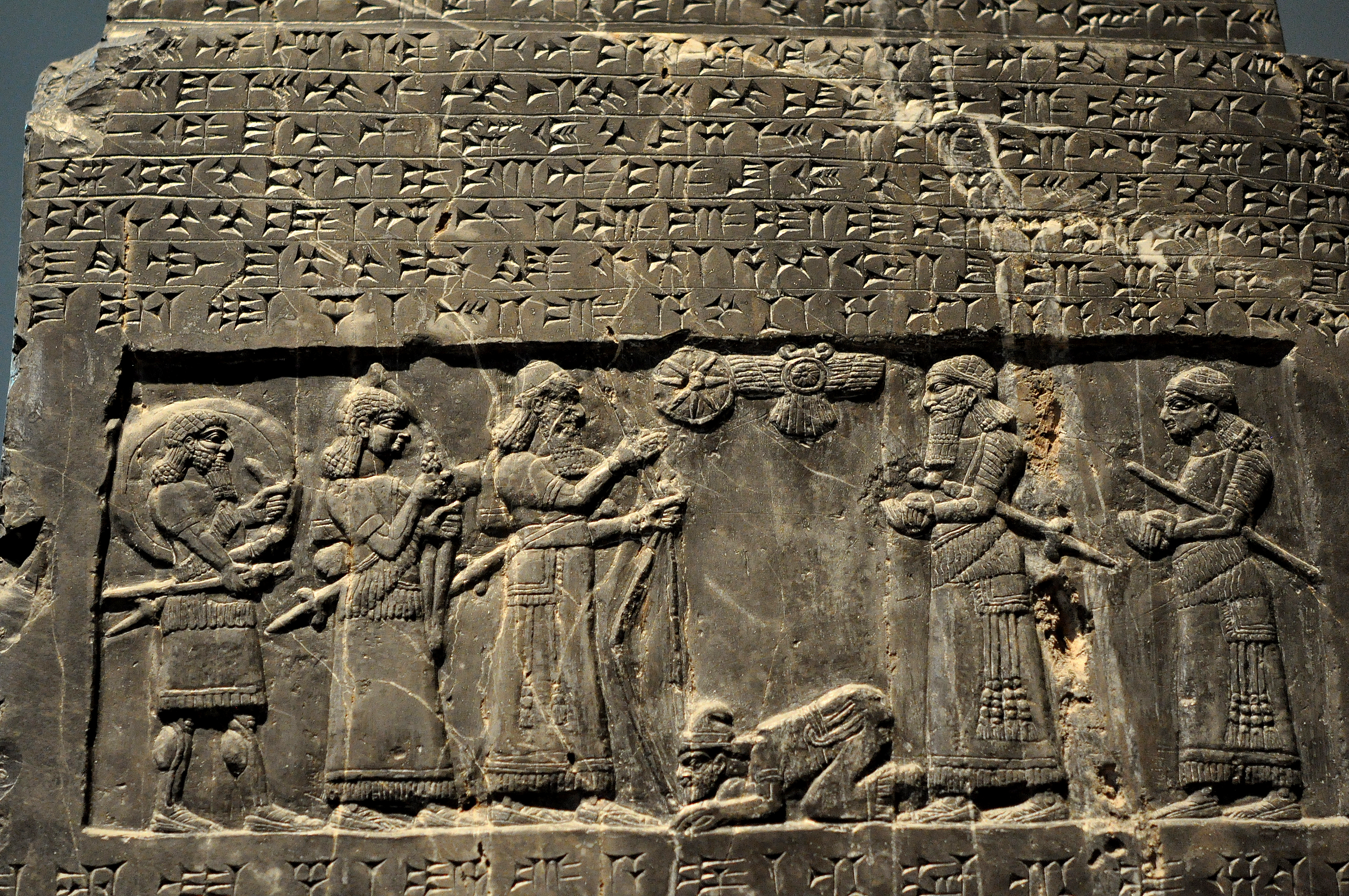
The Black Obelisk of Shalmaneser III. The king, surrounded by his royal attendants and a high-ranking official, receives a tribute from Sua, king of Gilzanu (north-west Iran), who bows and prostrates before the king. From Nimrud, northern Mesopotamia (Iraq). Neo-Assyrian period, 825 BC. The British Museum, London.

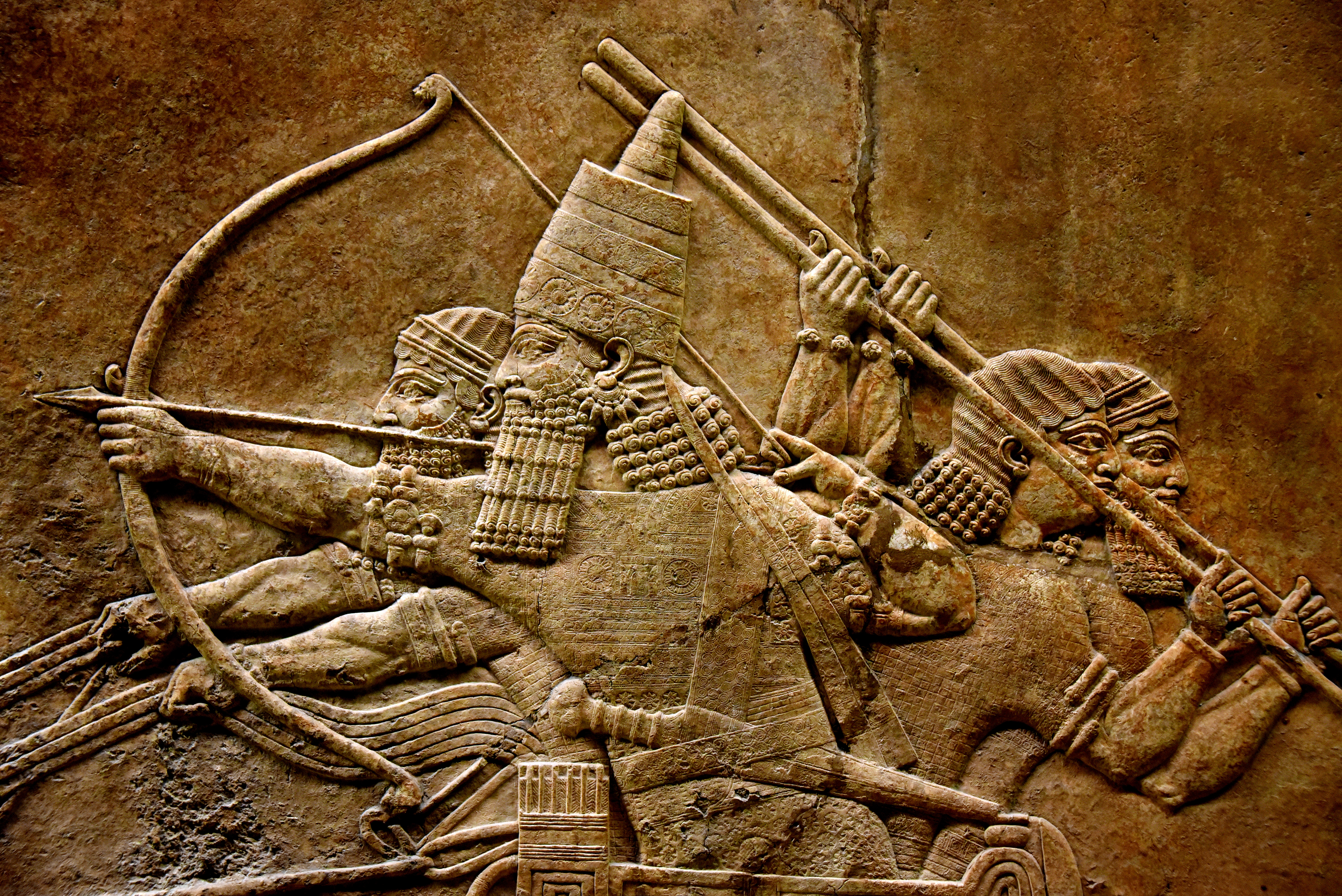
7th-century BC relief depicting Ashurbanipal (r. 669–631 BC) and three royal attendants in a chariot. From the North Palace at Nineveh

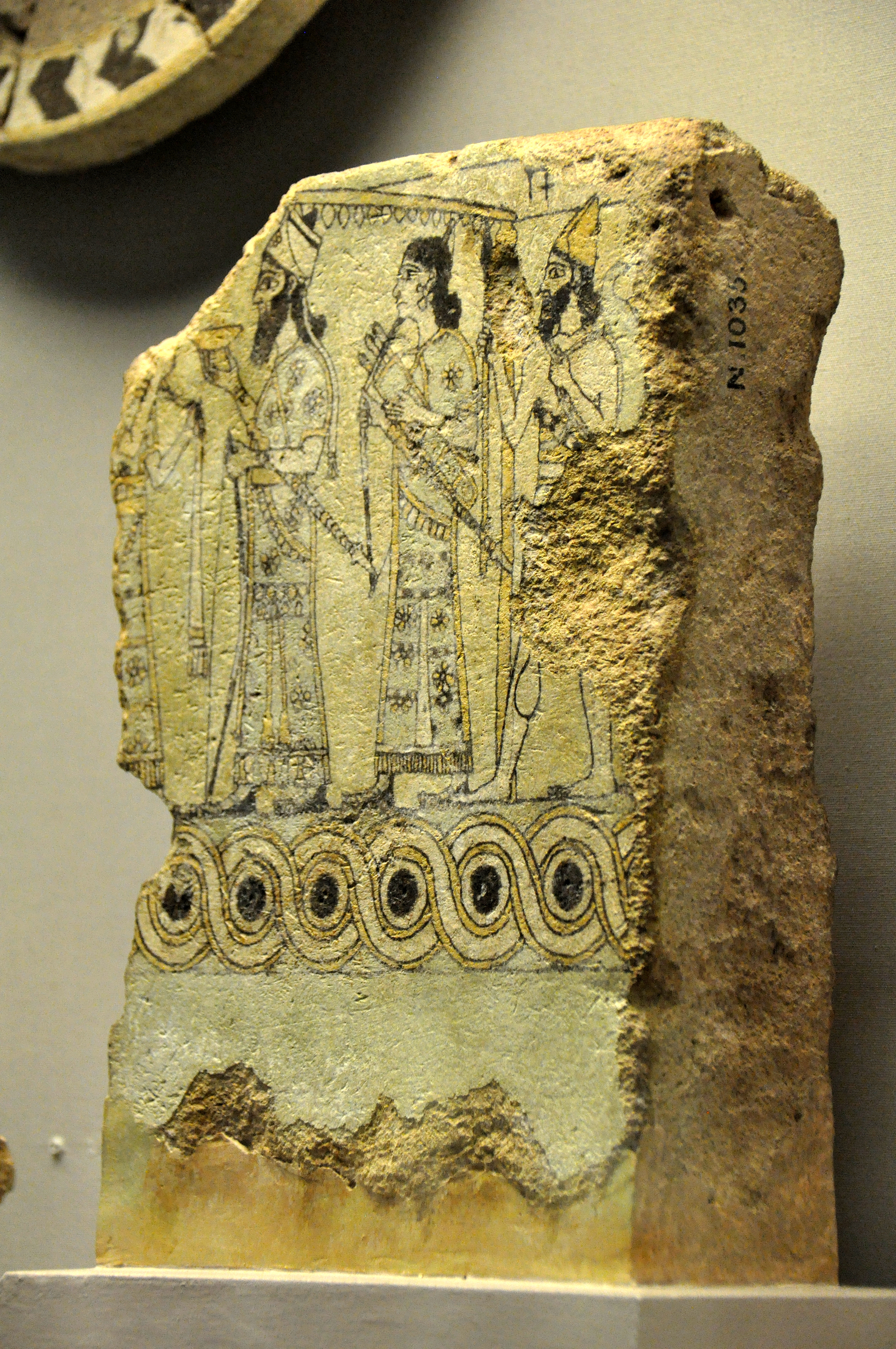
Glazed terracotta tile from Nimrud, with a court scene; 875–850 BC; fired and glazed clay; height (without base): 30.6 cm, height (with base): 38.3 cm; British Museum

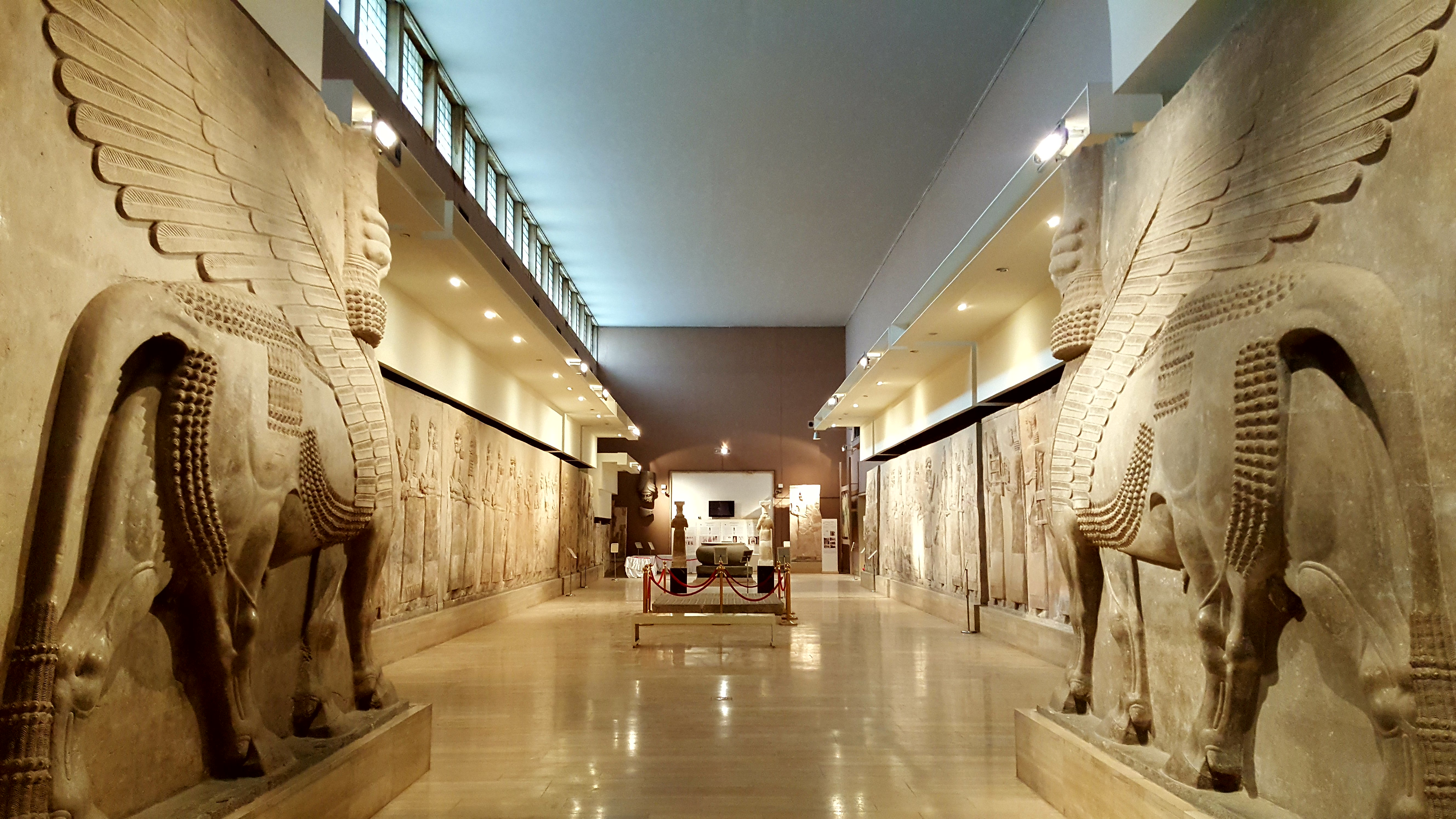
Lammasu, an Assyrian protective deity. Initially depicted as a goddess in Sumerian times, when it was called Lamma, it was later depicted in Assyrian times as a hybrid of a human, bird, and either a bull or lion—specifically having a human head, the body of a bull or a lion, and bird wings, under the name Lamassu. Iraq Museum

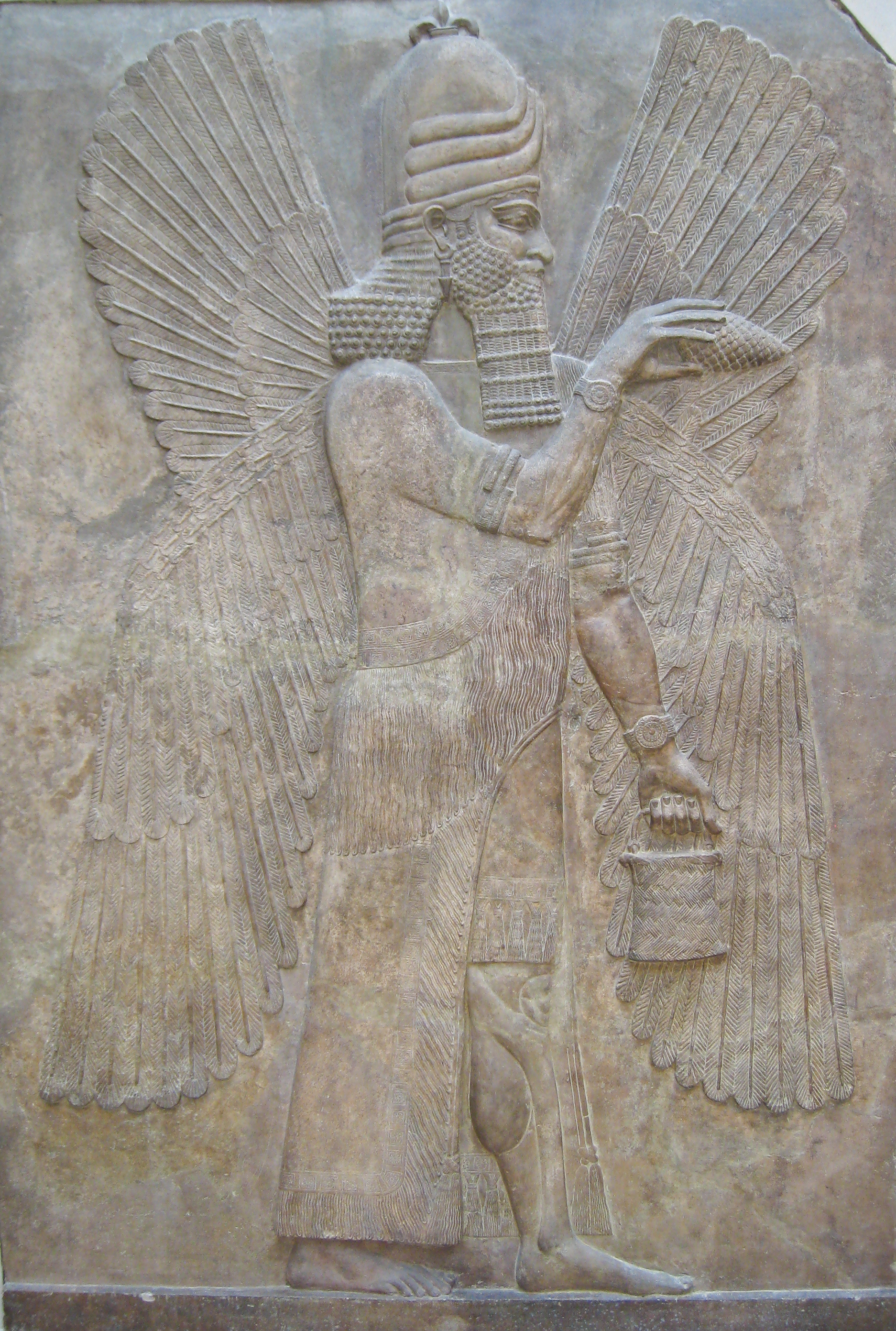
Relief with a winged genie with bucket and cone; 713–706 BC; height: 3.3 m; Louvre

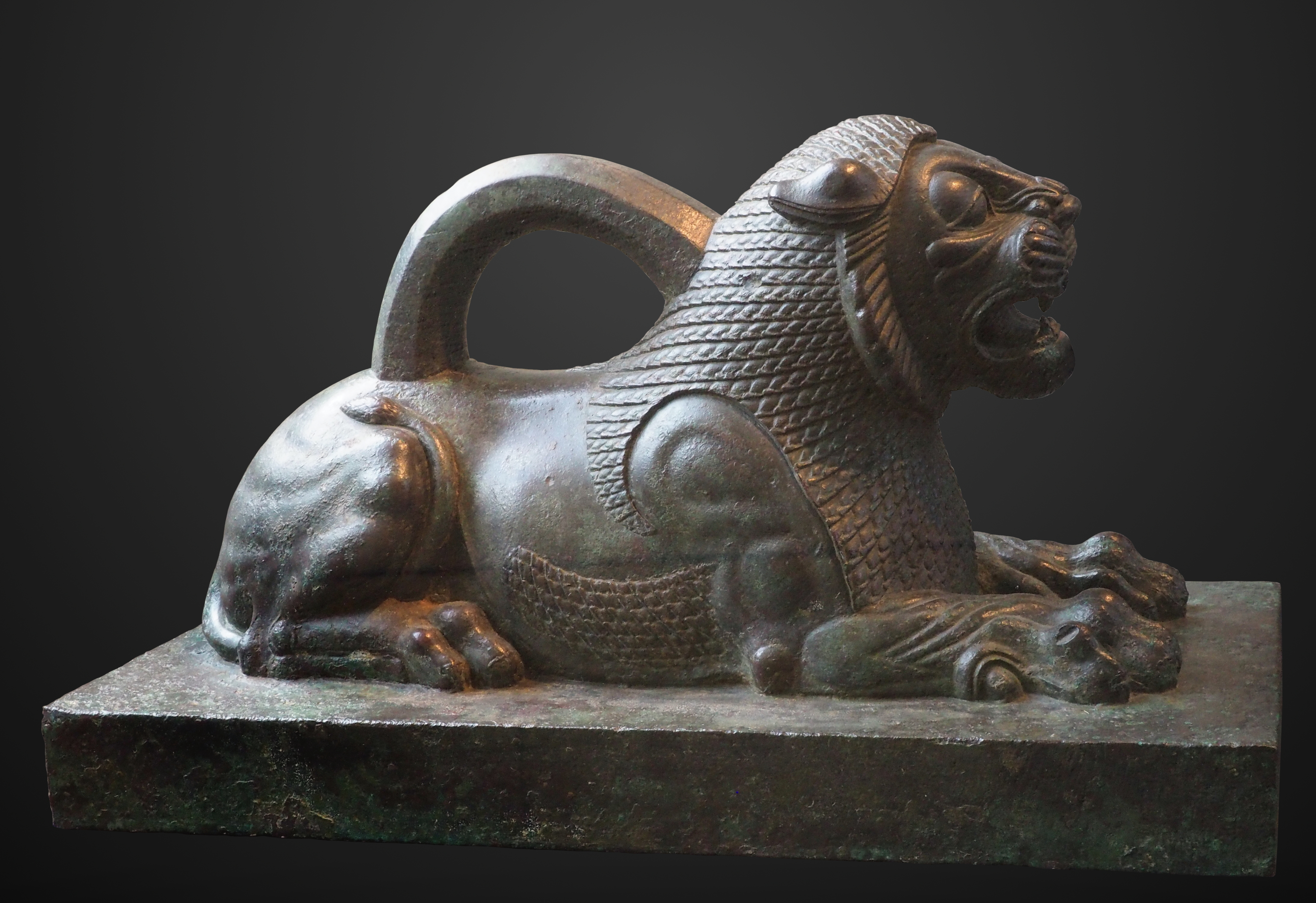
Lion weight; 6th–4th century BC; bronze; height: 29.5 cm; Louvre

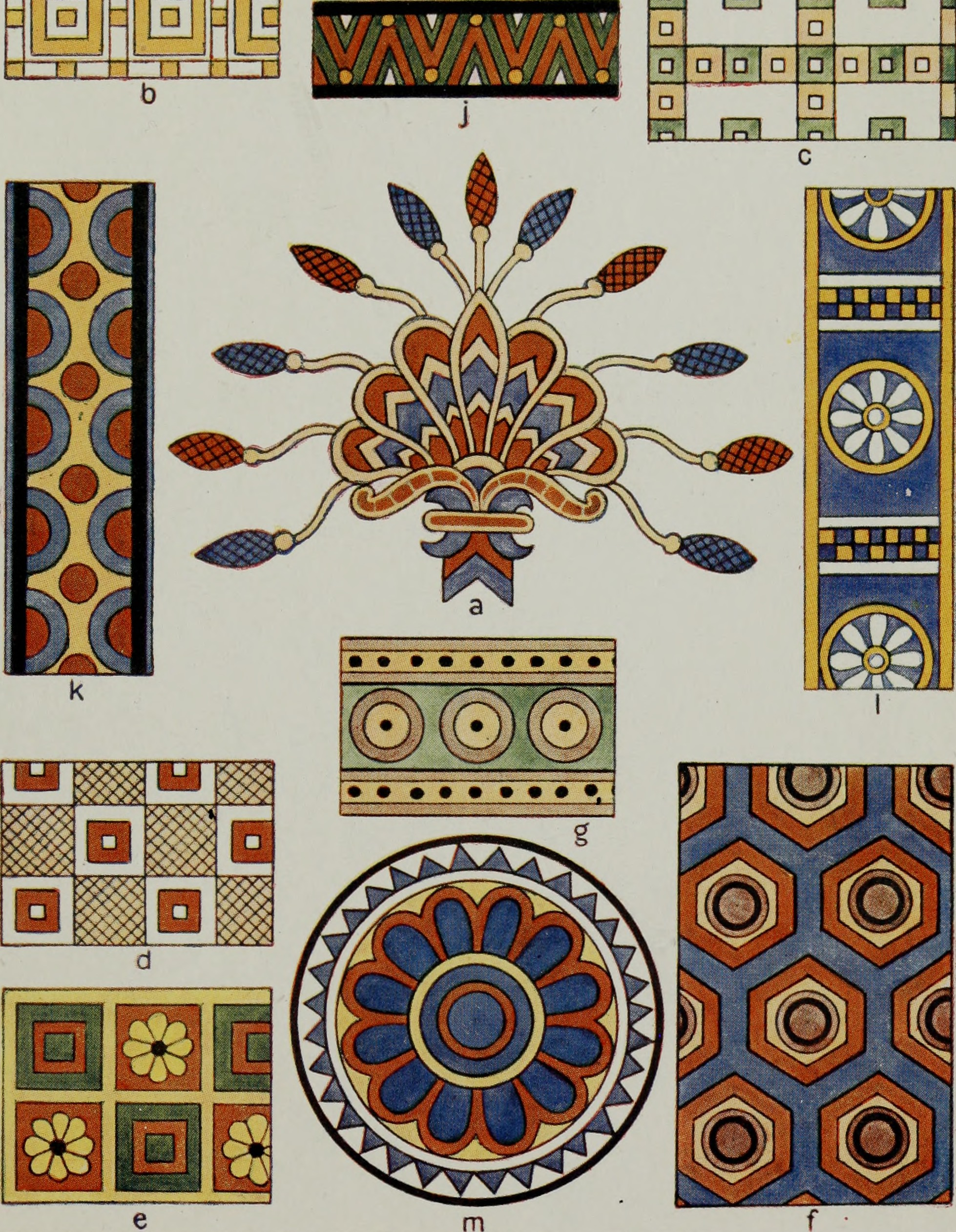
Assyrian ornaments and patterns, illustrated in a book from 1920

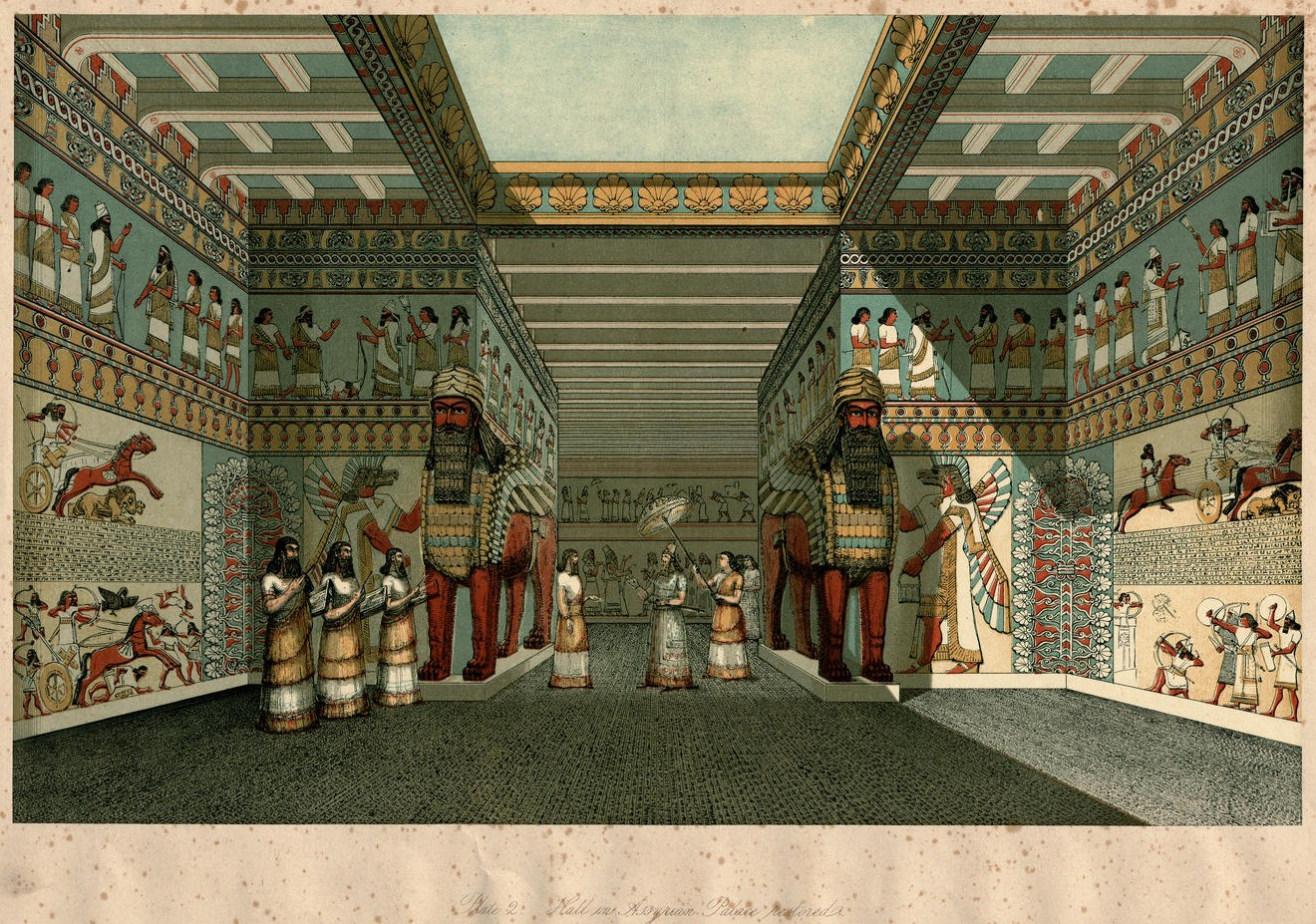
Illustration of a hall in the Assyrian Palace of Ashurnasrirpal II by Austen Henry Layard (1854)

==== Babylonian ====
The conquest of Sumer and Akkad by Babylon marks a turning point in the artistic and political history of the region.

The Babylonians took advantage of the abundance of clay in Mesopotamia to create bricks. The use of brick led to the early development of the pilaster and column, as well as of frescoes and enameled tiles. The walls were brilliantly colored, and sometimes plated with bronze or gold as well as with tiles. Painted terra-cotta cones were also embedded in the plaster.

The Babylonians often worked with metal. They created functional tools with copper. It is possible that Babylonia was the original home of copperworking, which then spread westward. In addition, the want of stone in Babylonia made every pebble precious and led to a high perfection of the art of gem-cutting. The arts of Babylon also included tapestries, and Babylonian civilization was famous for its tapestries and rugs.

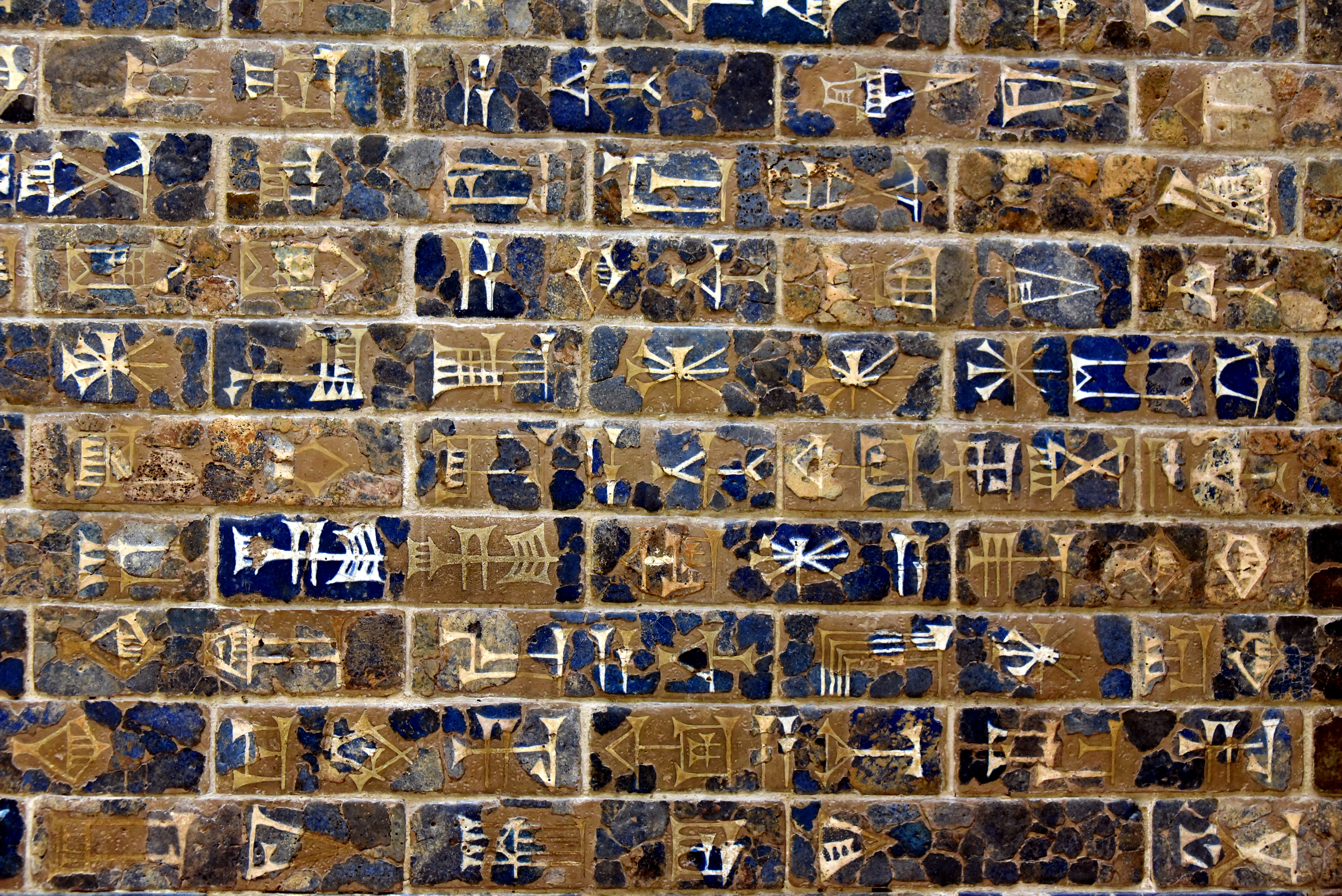
Detail of Nebuchadnezzar II's Building Inscription plaque of the Ishtar Gate, from Babylon, Iraq. 6th century BC. Pergamon Museum

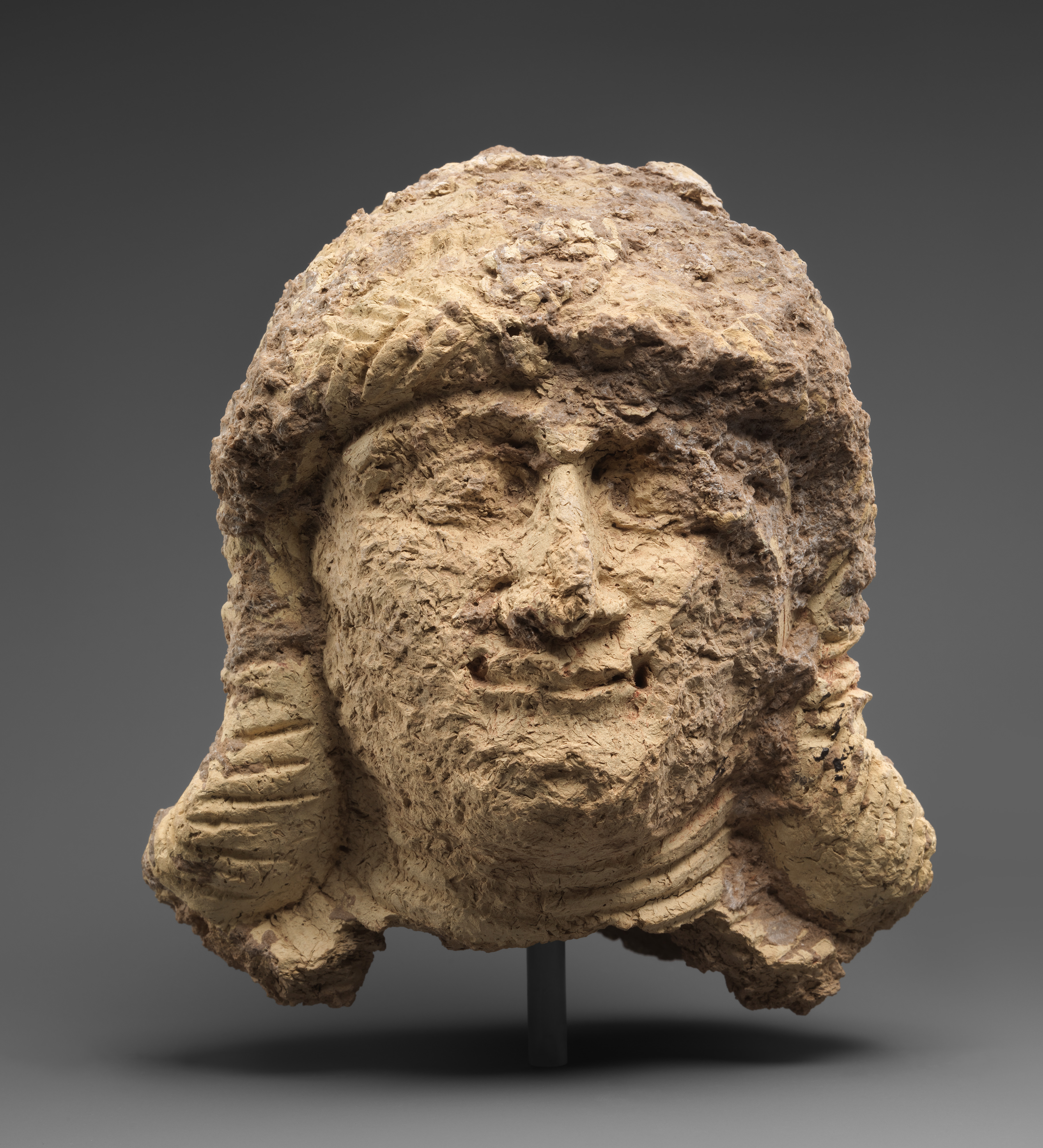
Female head; circa 2000–1600 BC; ceramic; 18 x 12.7 cm; Metropolitan Museum of Art (New York City)

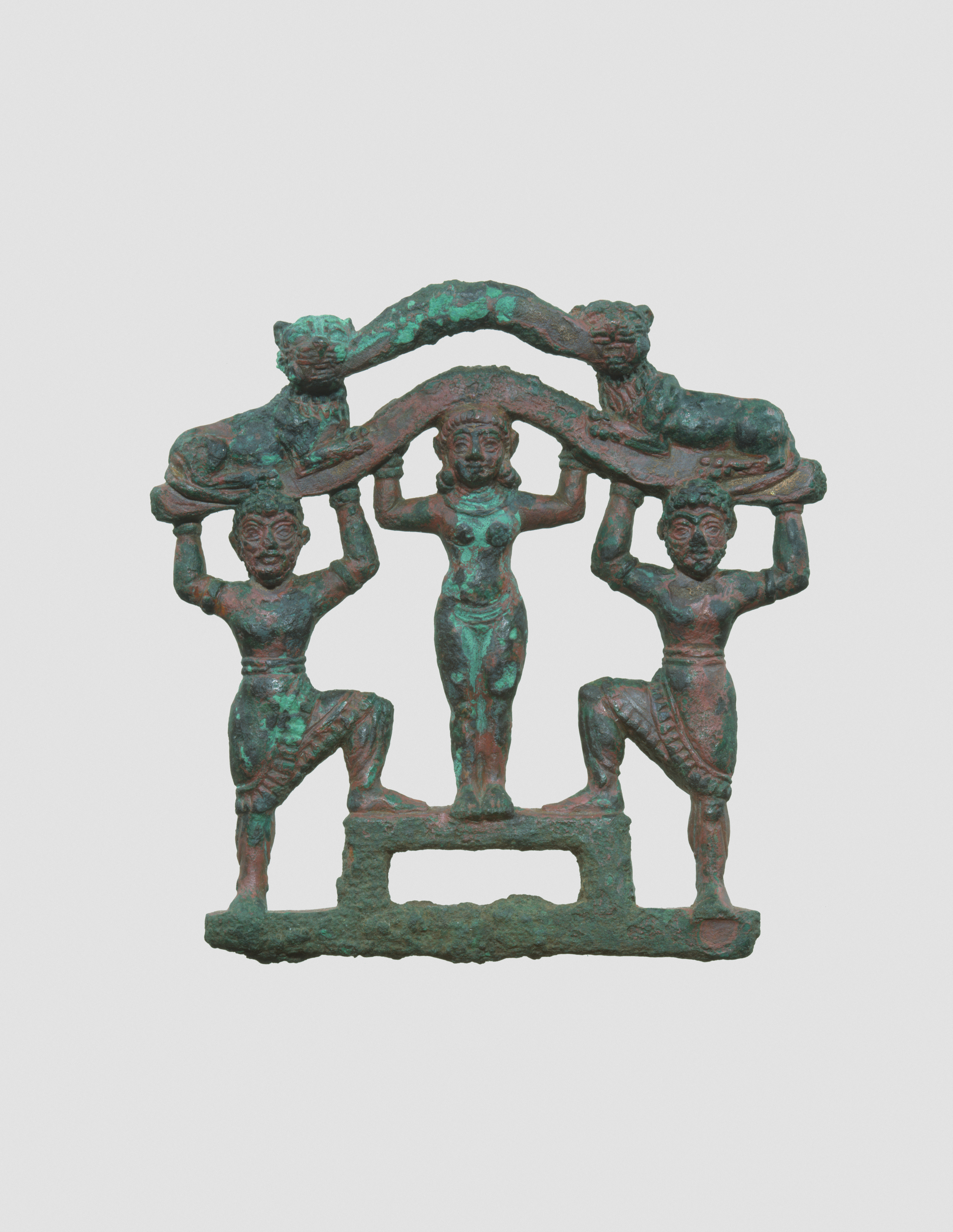
Plaque with a nude female between two bearded males wearing kilts; circa 2000–1600 BC; bronze; 9.7 x 9.7 cm; Metropolitan Museum of Art

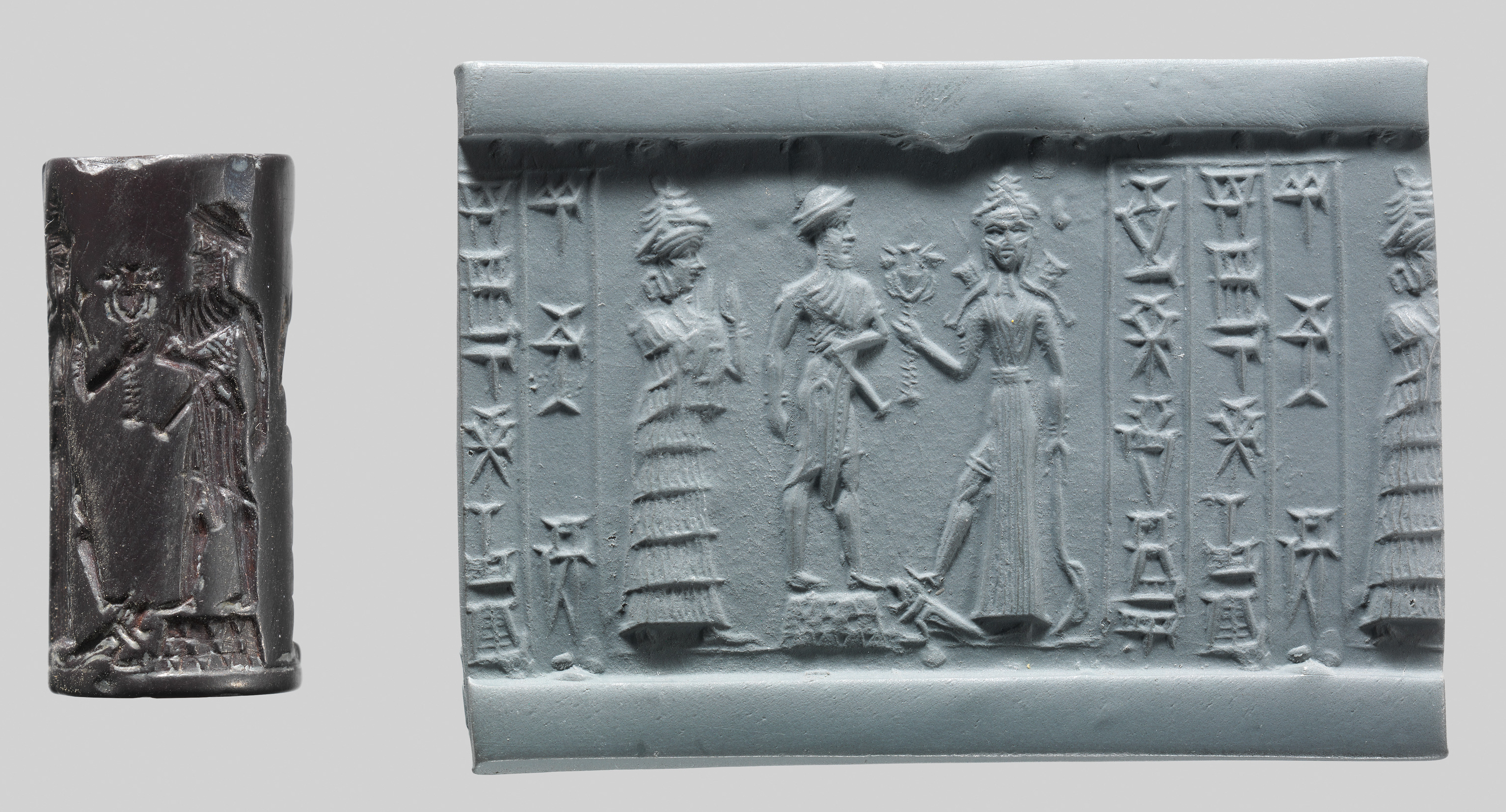
Cylinder seal with an impression; circa 18th–17th century BC; hematite; 2.39 cm; Metropolitan Museum of Art

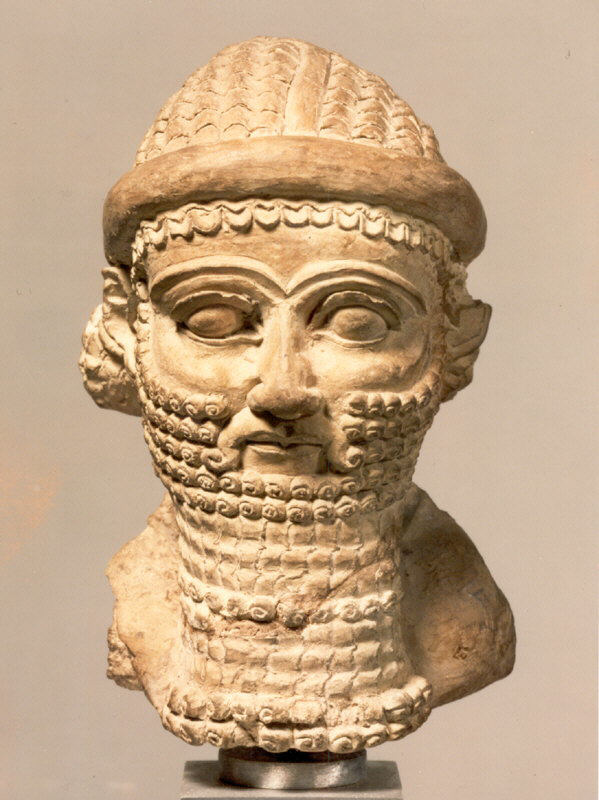
Male head; circa late 8th–early 7th century; ceramic; 12.5 cm; Metropolitan Museum of Art

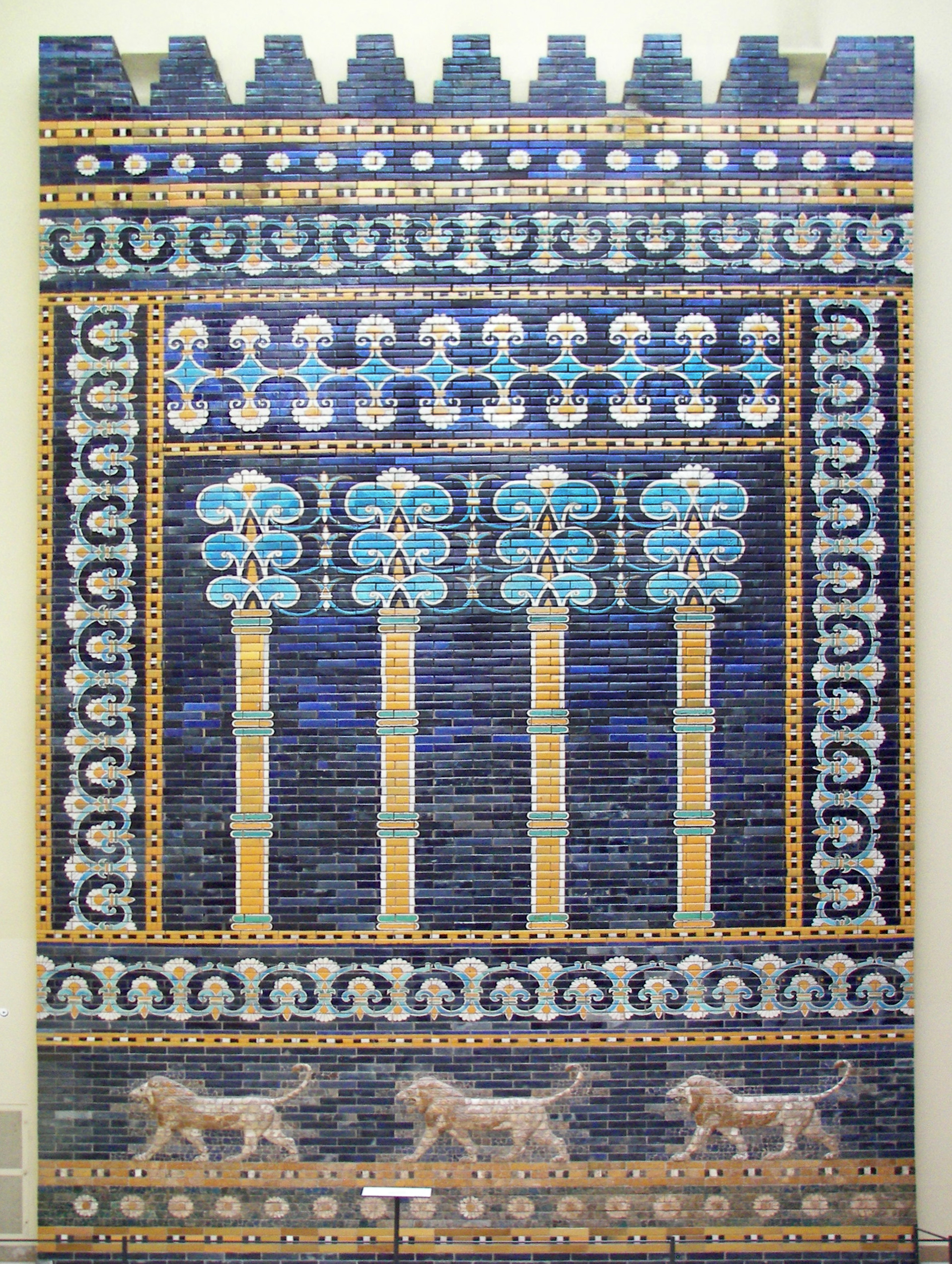
Facade of the Throne Room. Babylon, coloured, glazed bricks. 604–562 BC. The Throne-Room was situated in the third courtyard complex of the royal palace.

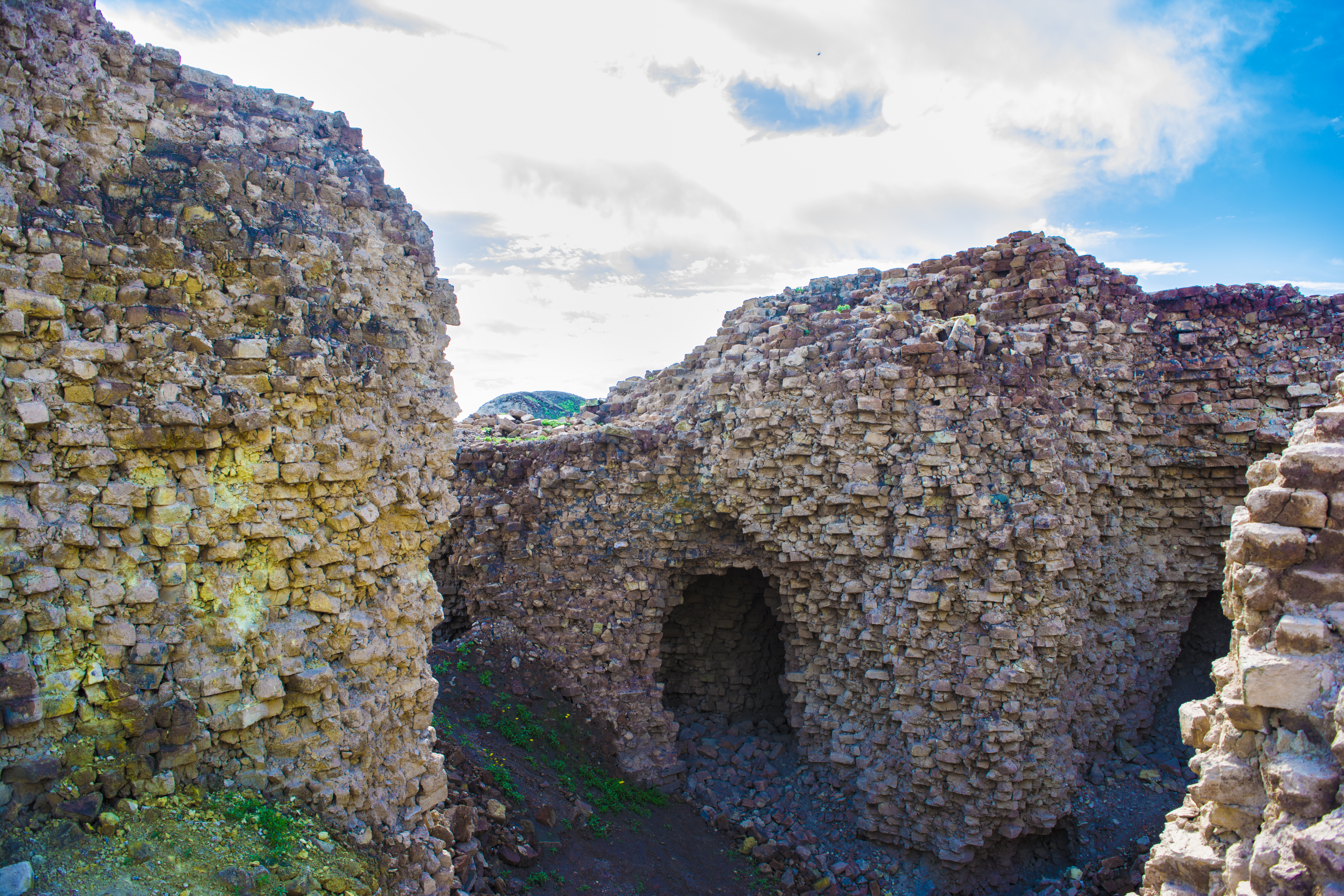
Remains of brick structures in Babylon

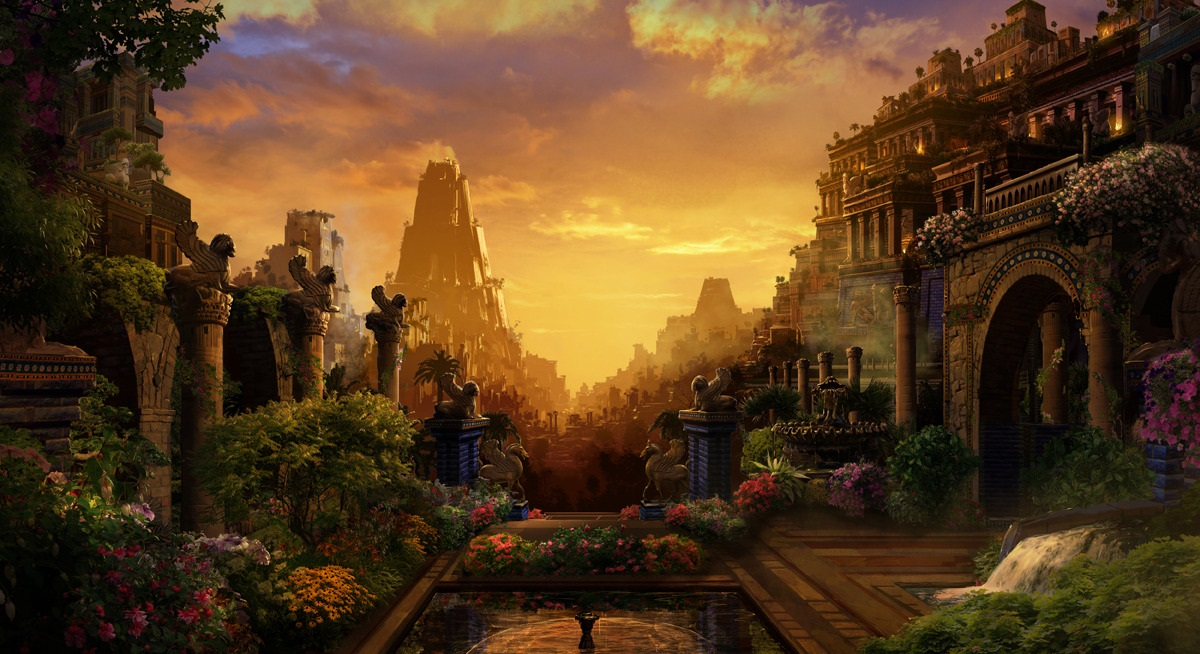
Contemporary artwork depicting Babylon at the height of its stature.

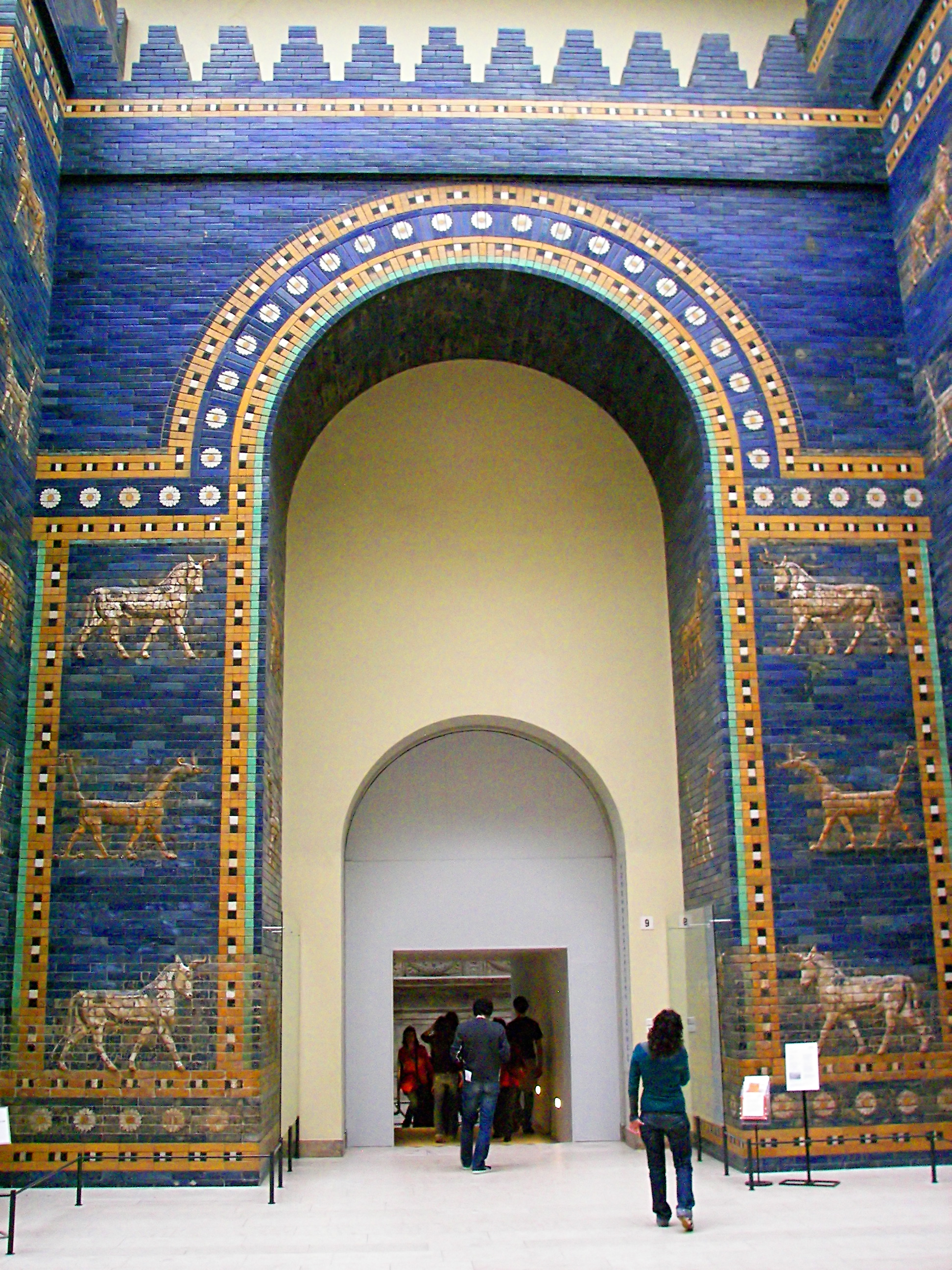
The Ishtar Gate was the eighth gate to the inner city of Babylon. It was constructed circa 575 BC by order of King Nebuchadnezzar II on the north side of the city.

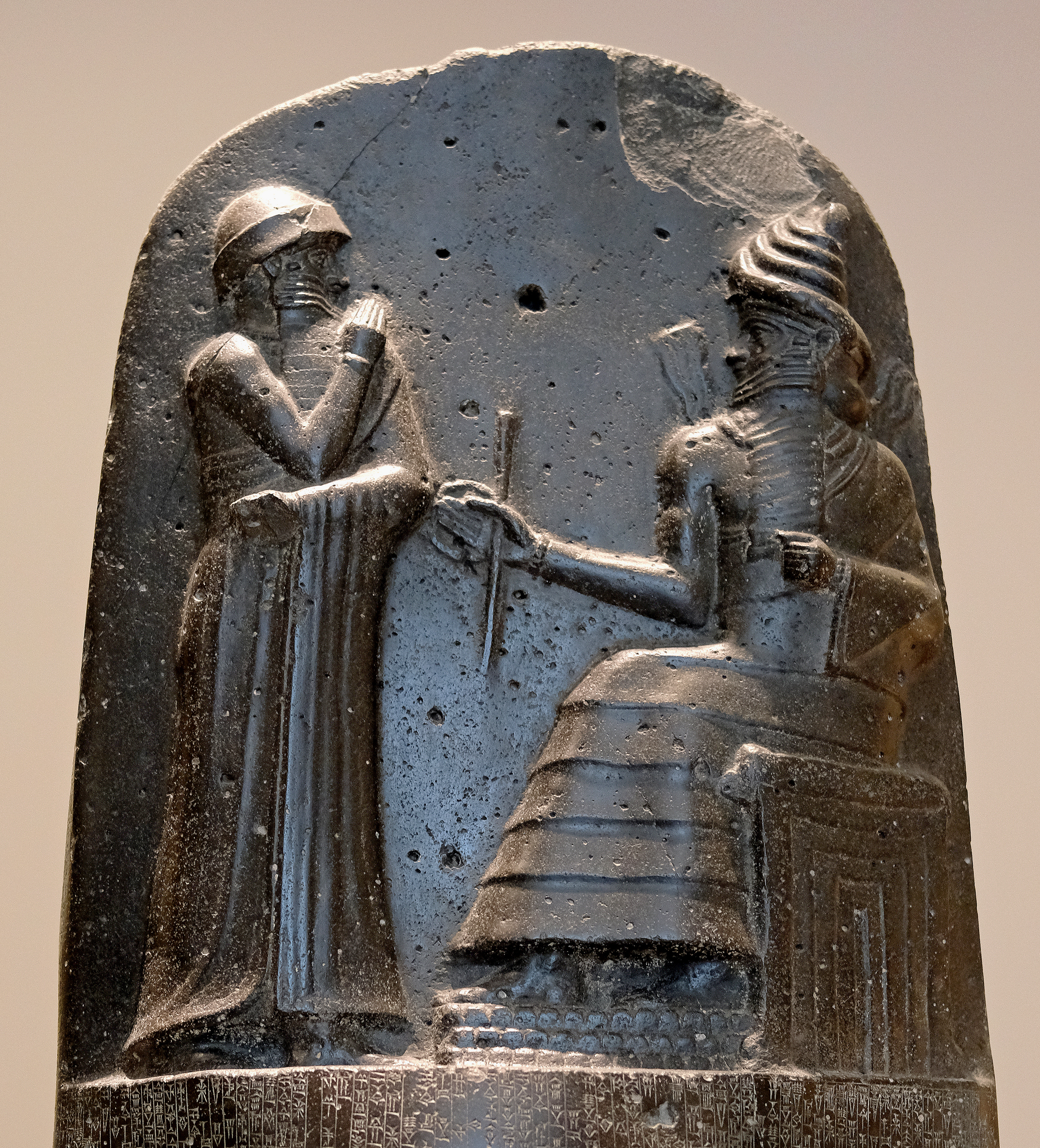
Hammurabi (left), depicted as receiving his royal insignia from Shamash (or possibly Marduk). Hammurabi holds his hands over his mouth as a sign of prayer (relief on the upper part of the stele of Hammurabi's code of laws).

==== Sumerian ====
Archaeological evidence attests to their existence during the 5th millennium BC. The Sumerians decorated their pottery with cedar oil paints. The Sumerians also developed jewelry.

A notable example of surviving Sumerian art is the Standard of Ur, dated to approximately 2500 BC. The Standard is a wooden box inlaid with shells and lapis lazuli depicting soldiers presenting their king with prisoners on one side and peasants presenting him with gifts on the other.

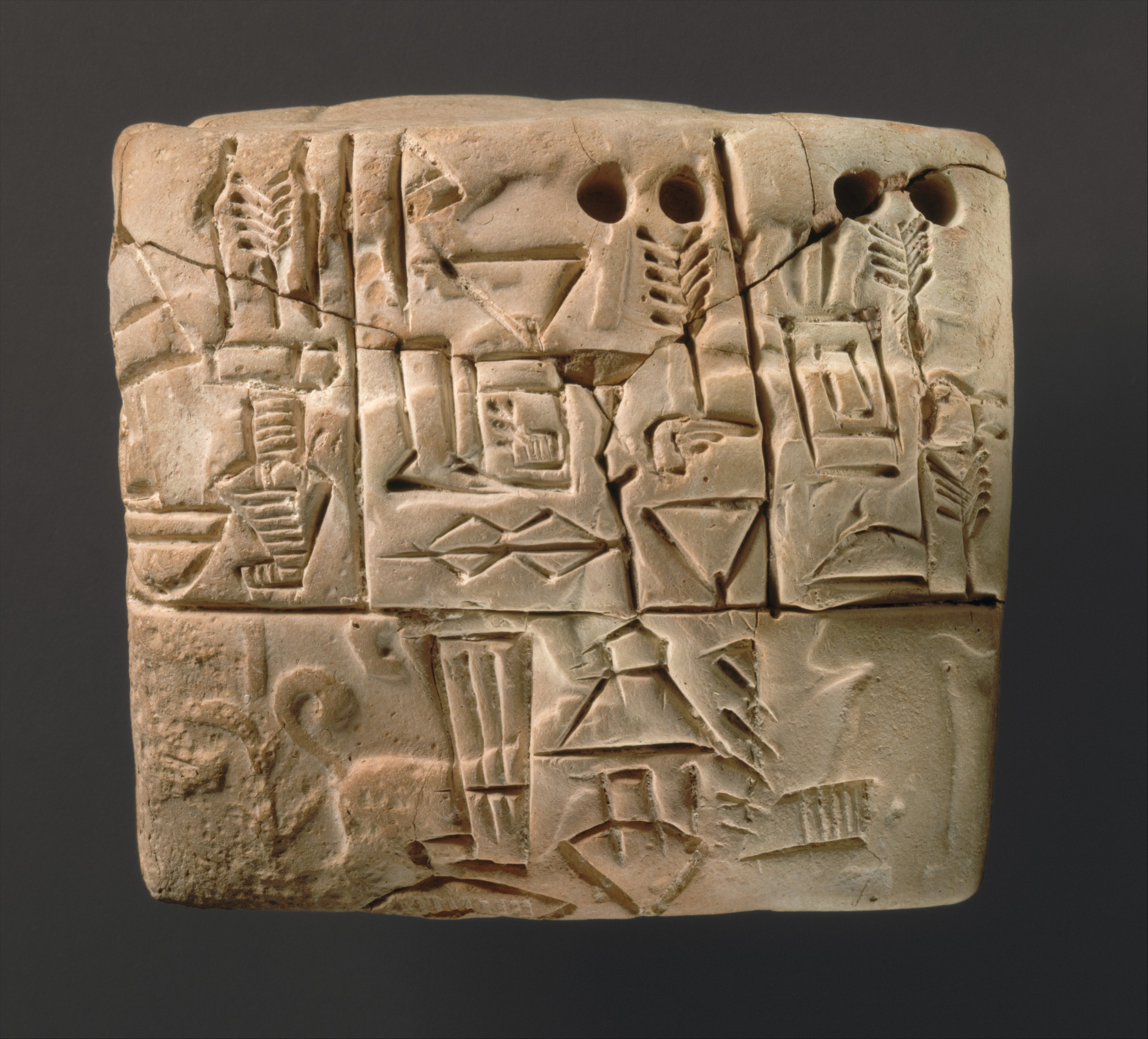
Cuneiform tablet; 3100–2900 BC; clay; 5.5 x 6 x 4.15 cm; Metropolitan Museum of Art (New York City)

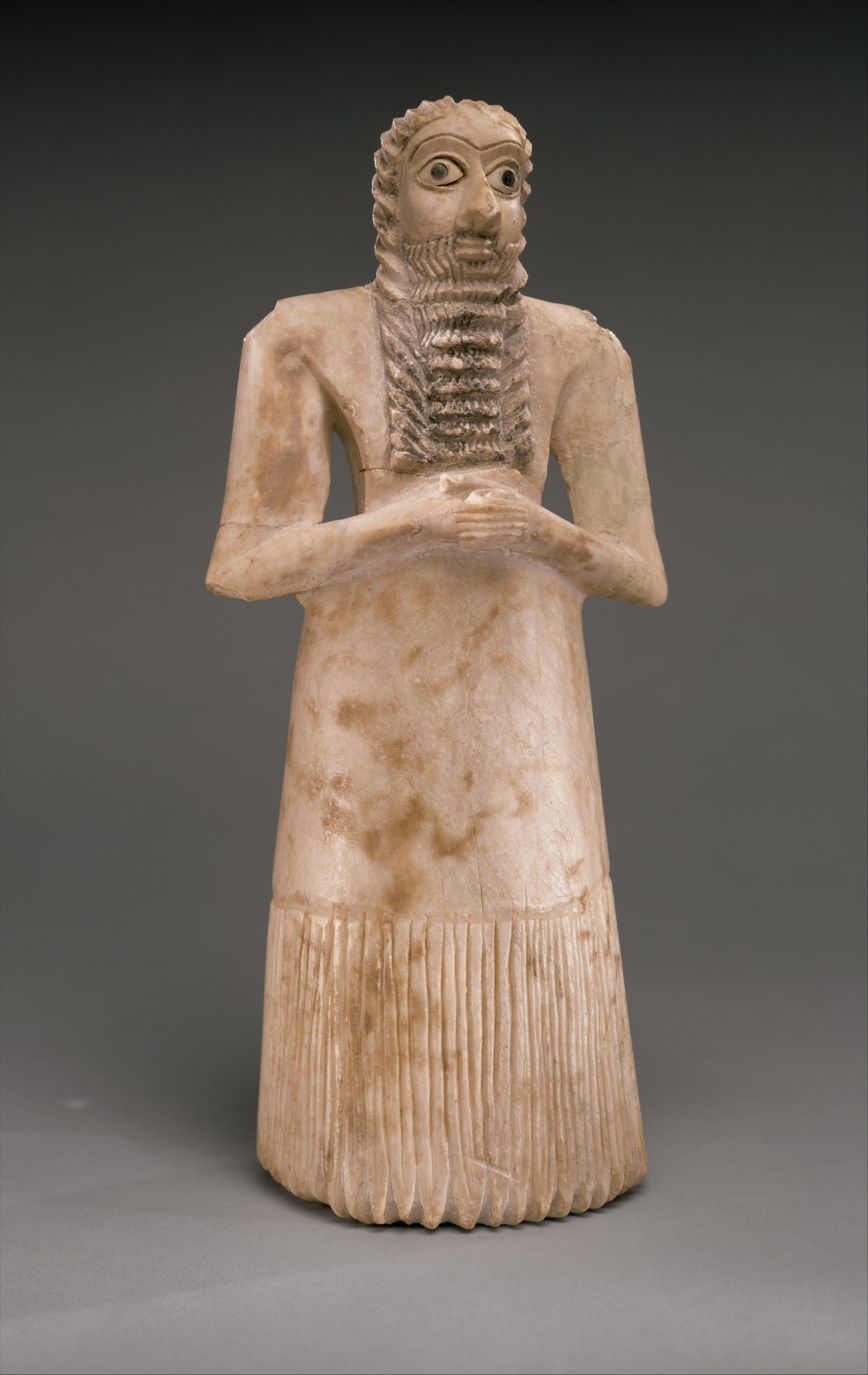
Standing male worshiper, one of the twelve statues in the Tell Asmar Hoard; 2900–2600 BC; gypsum alabaster, shell, black limestone and bitumen; 29.5 x 12.9 x 10 cm; Metropolitan Museum of Art

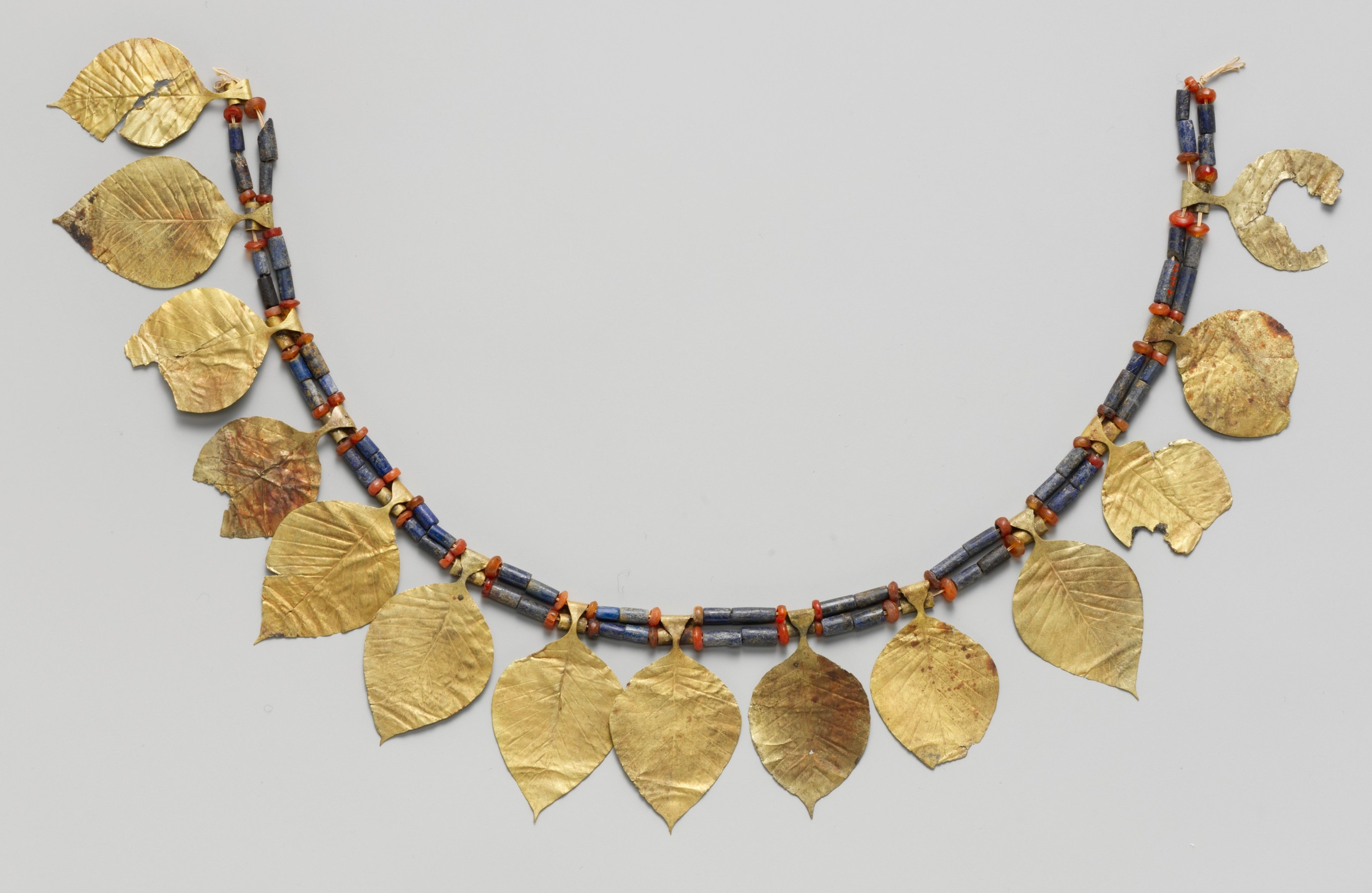
Headdress; 2600–2500 BC; gold (the leaves), lapis lazuli (the blue beads) and carnelian (the orange beads); length: 38.5 cm; Metropolitan Museum of Art

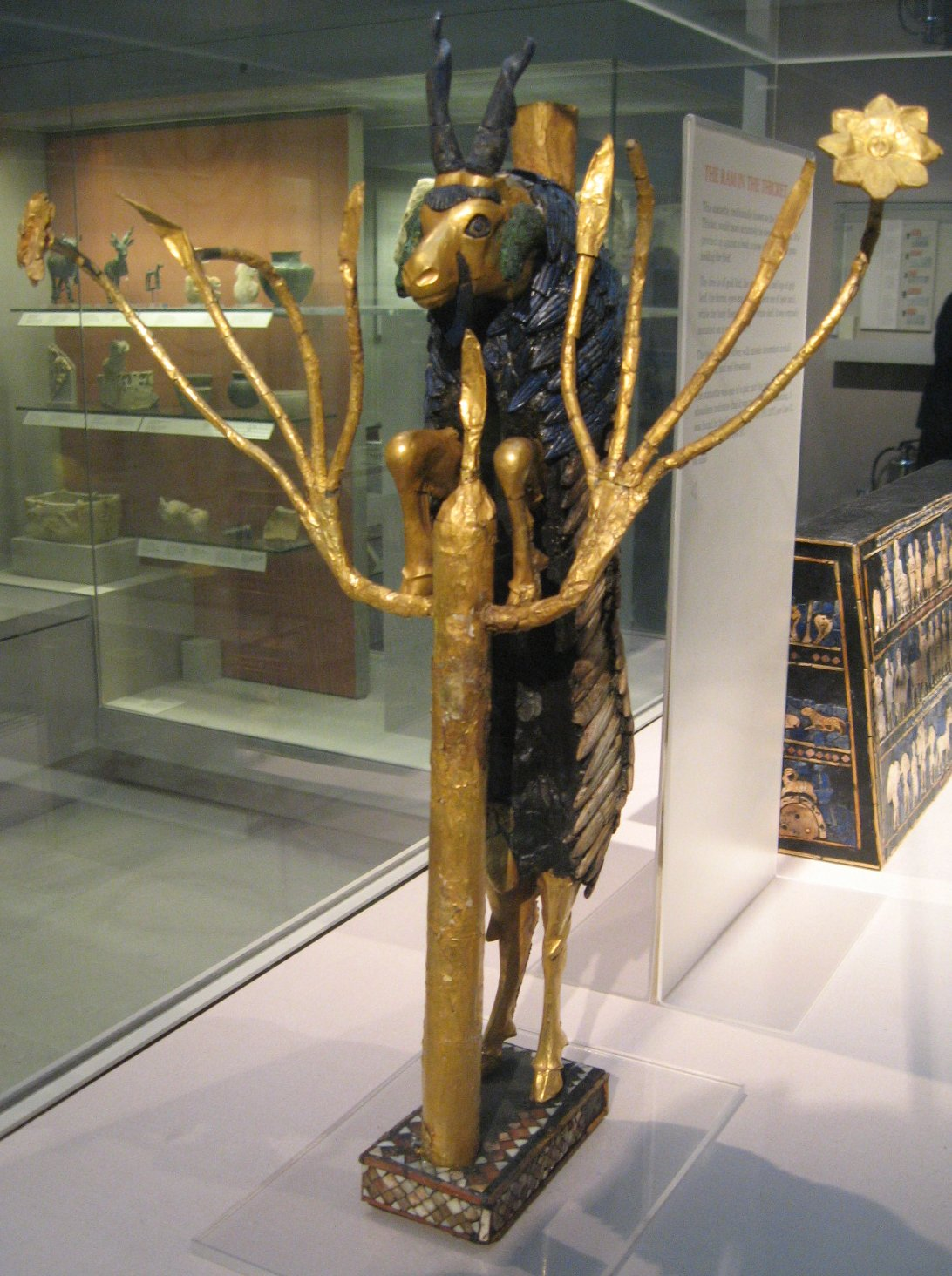
Ram in a Thicket; 2600–2400 BC; gold, copper, shell, lapis lazuli and limestone; height: 45.7 cm; from the Royal Cemetery at Ur (Dhi Qar Governorate, Iraq); British Museum (London)

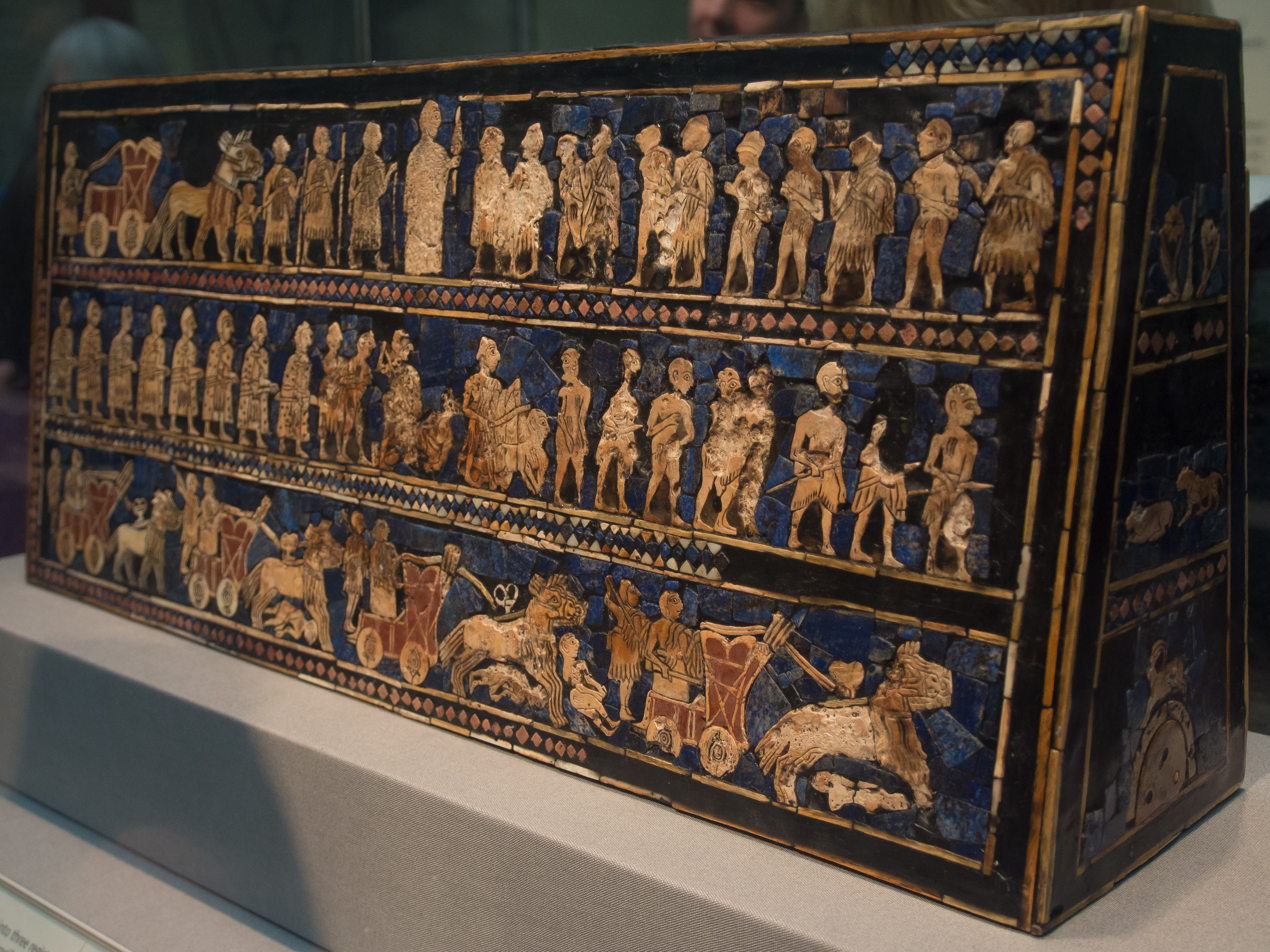
Standard of Ur; 2600–2400 BC; shell, red limestone and lapis lazuli on wood; length: 49.5 cm; from the Royal Cemetery at Ur; British Museum

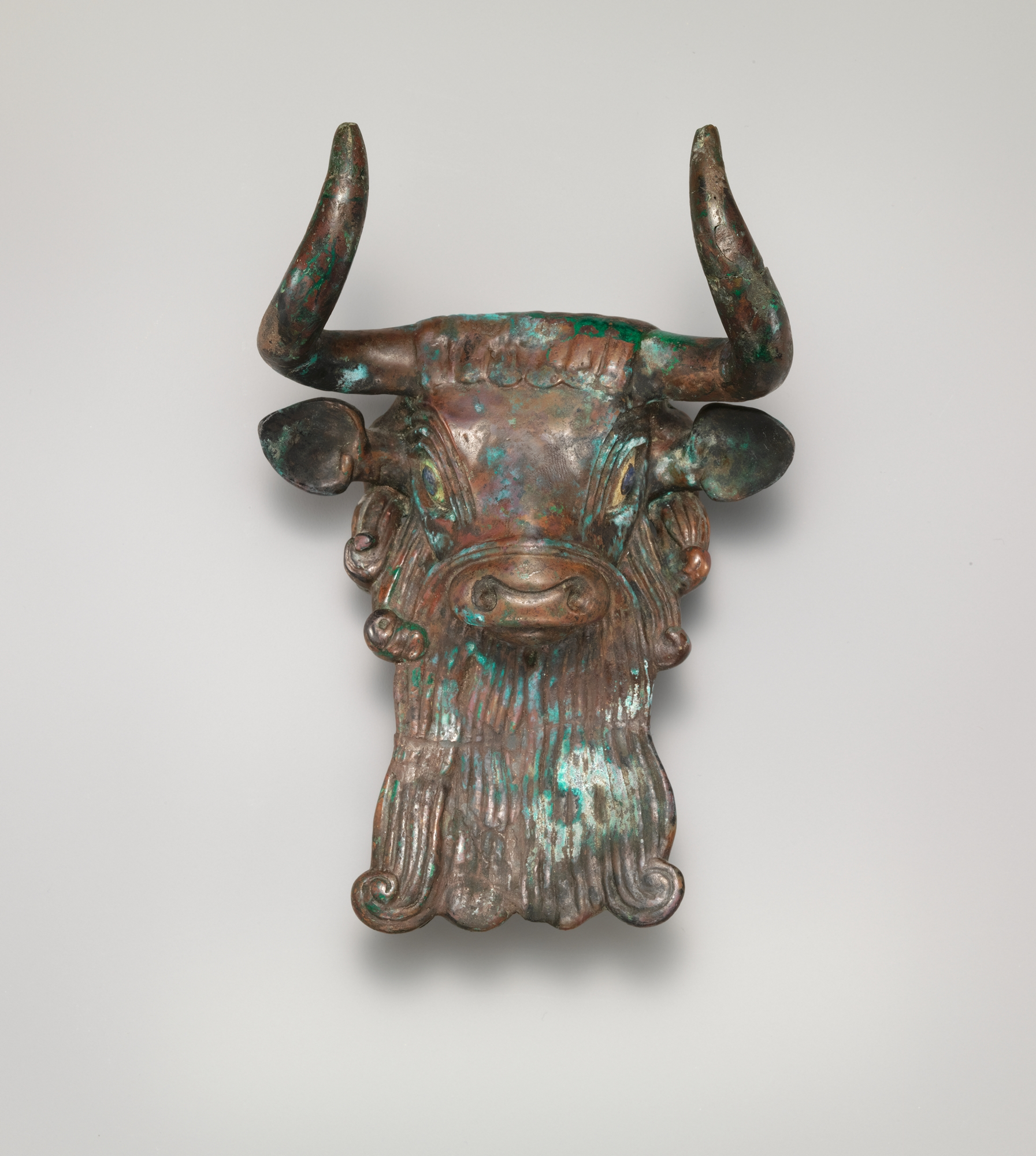
Bull's head ornament from a lyre; 2600–2350 BC; bronze inlaid with shell and lapis lazuli; height: 13.3 cm, width: 10.5 cm; Metropolitan Museum of Art

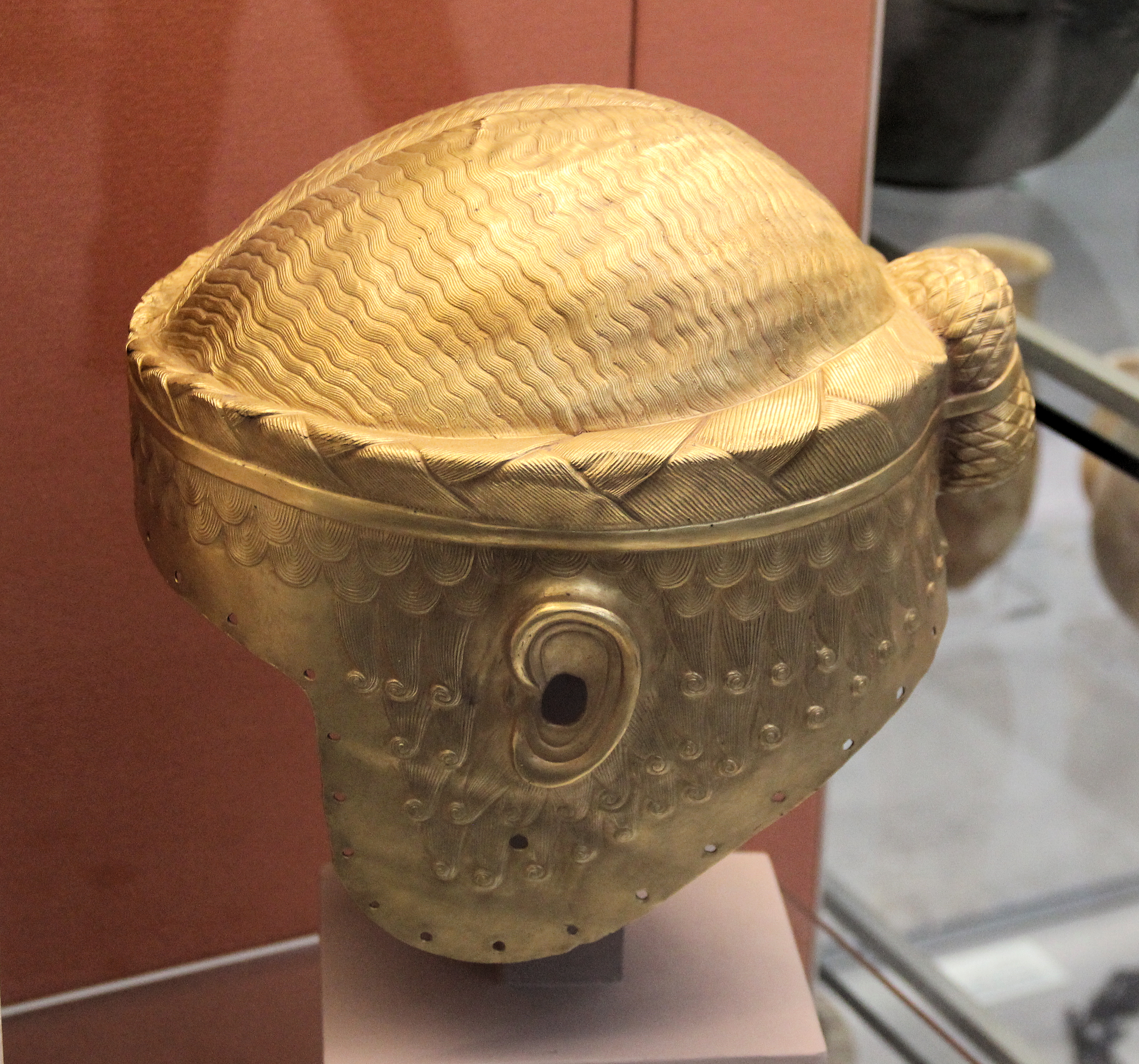
Golden helmet of Meskalamdug, possible founder of the First Dynasty of Ur, 26th century BC.

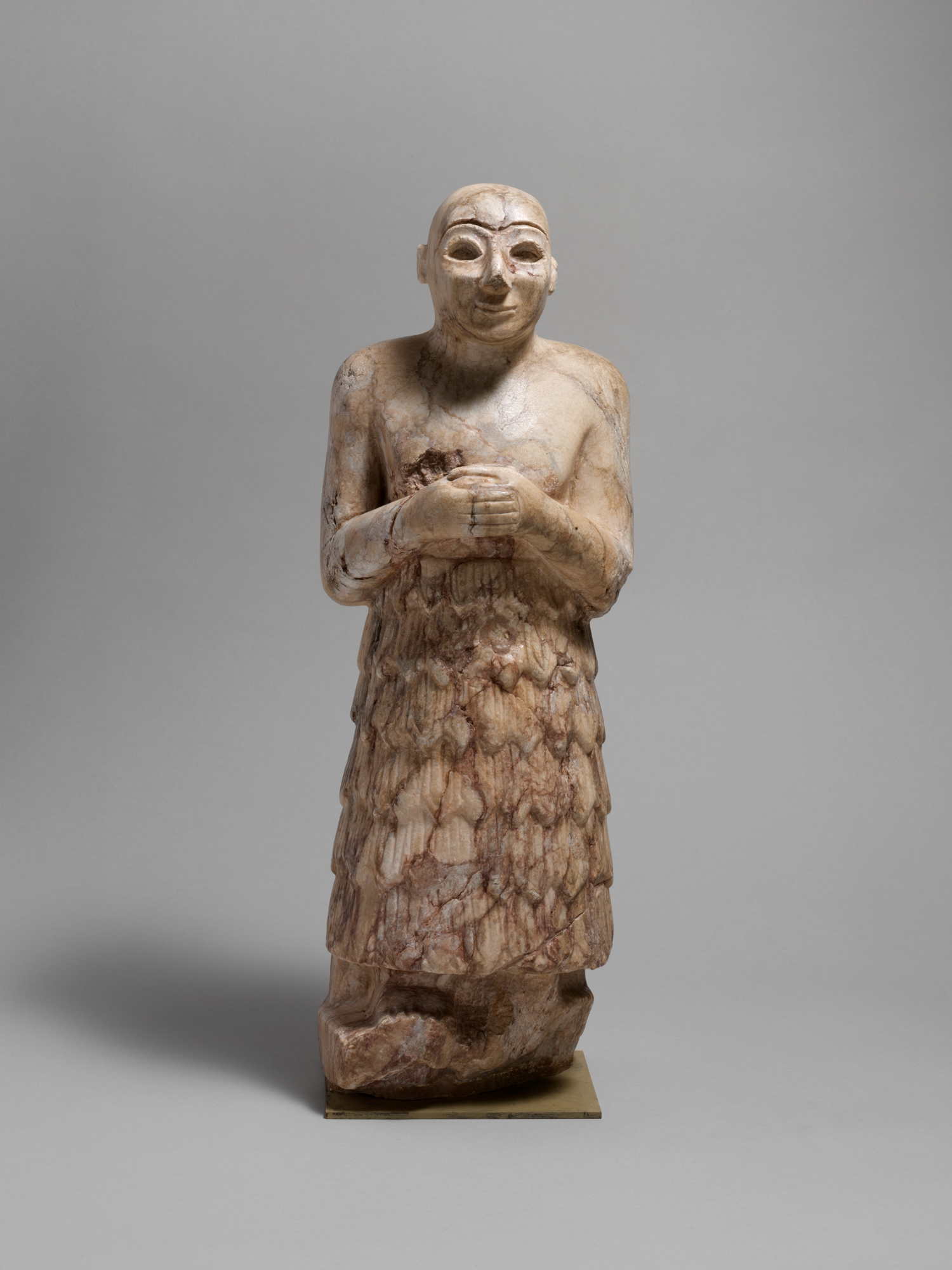
Votive figure; 2600–2350 BC; stone; height: 41.3 cm, width: 14.5 cm, depth: 13.5 cm; Metropolitan Museum of Art

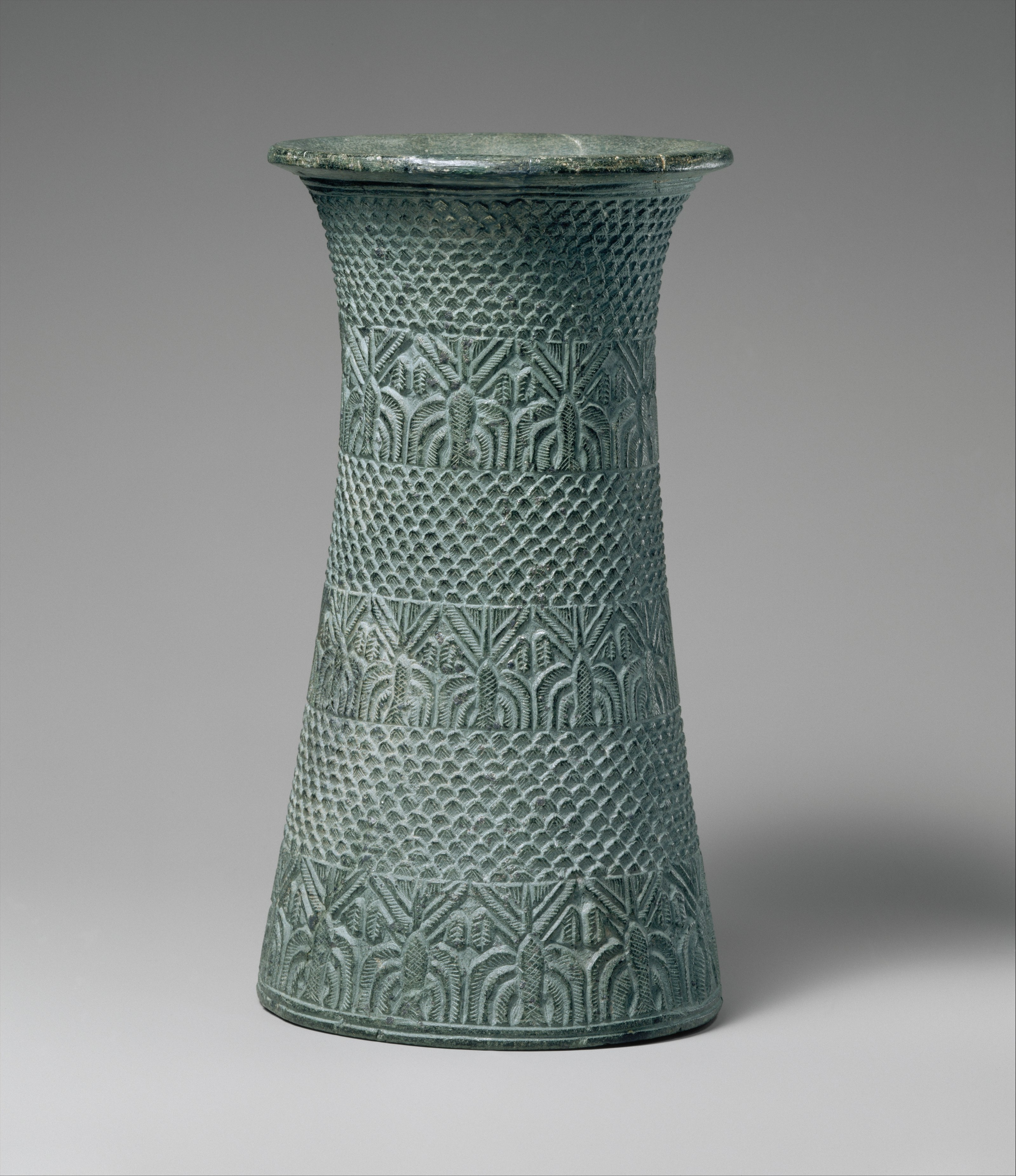
Vase with overlapping pattern and three bands of palm trees; mid- to late 3rd millennium BC; chlorite; height: 23.5 cm; Metropolitan Museum of Art

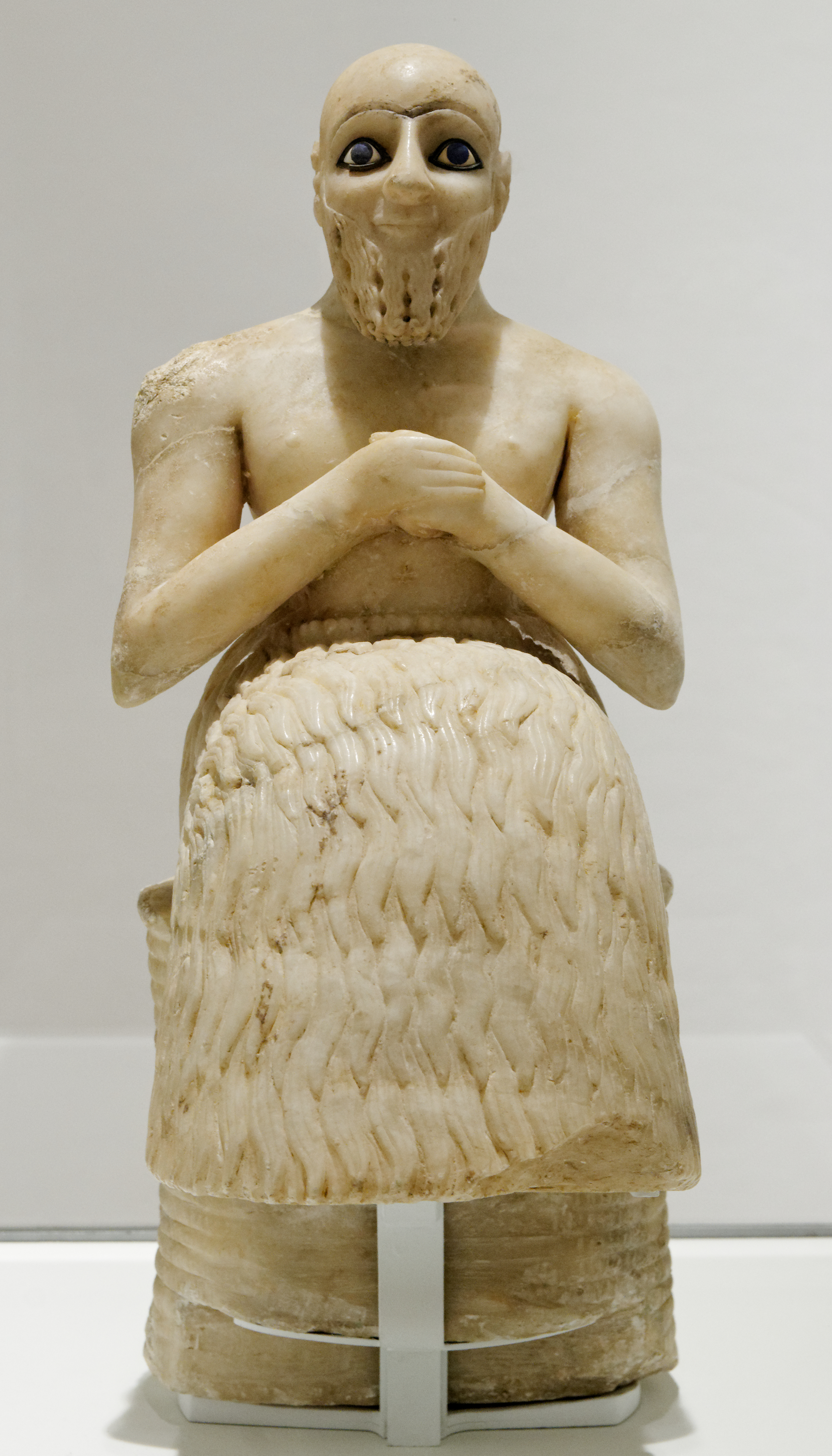
The Statue of Ebih-Il; c. 2400 BC; gypsum, schist, shells and lapis lazuli; height: 52.5 cm, width: 20.6 cm; discovered by André Parrot at the Temple of Ishtar (Mari, Syria); Louvre

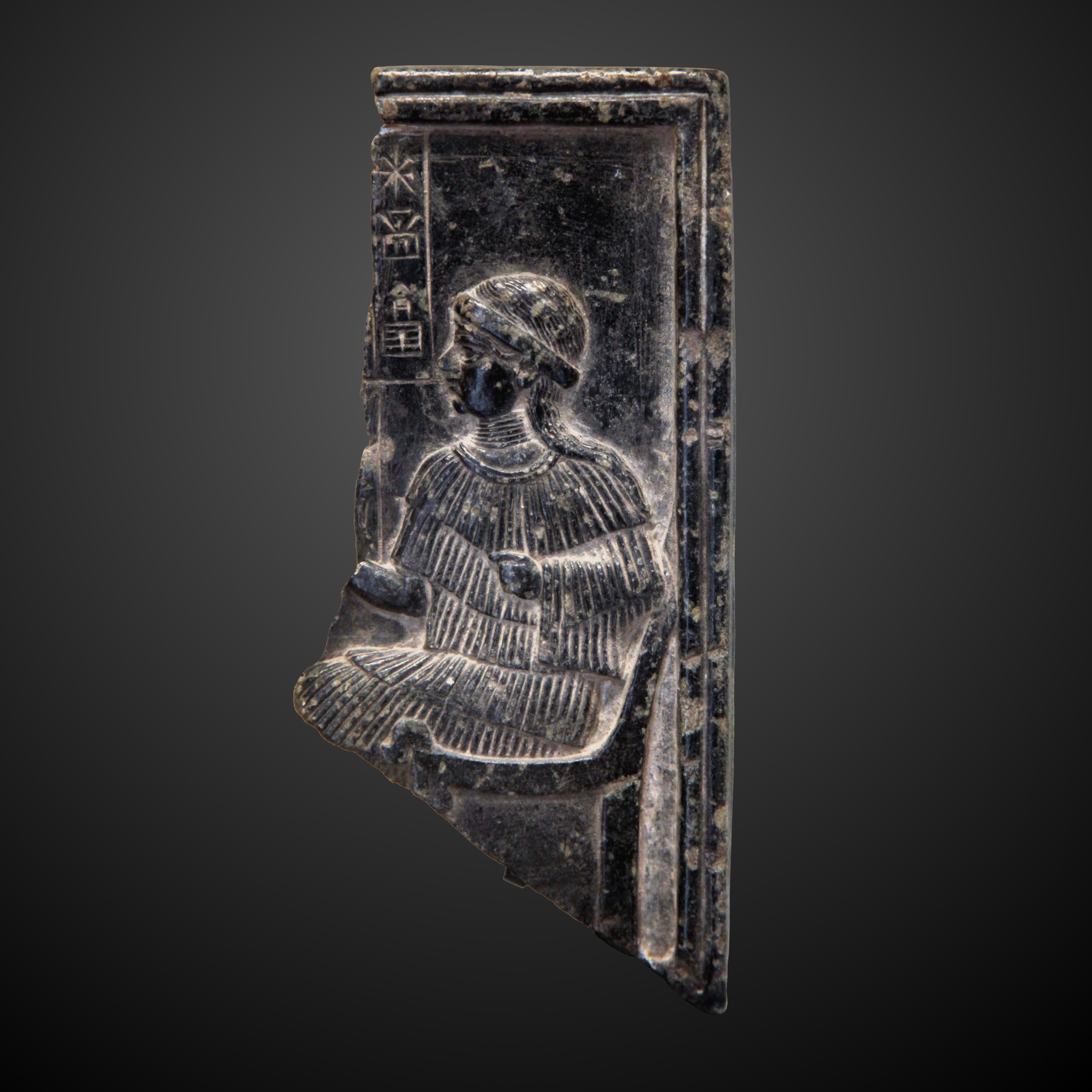
Fragment of a bas-relief with goddess Ninsun; 2255–2040 BC; steatite; height: 14 cm; Louvre

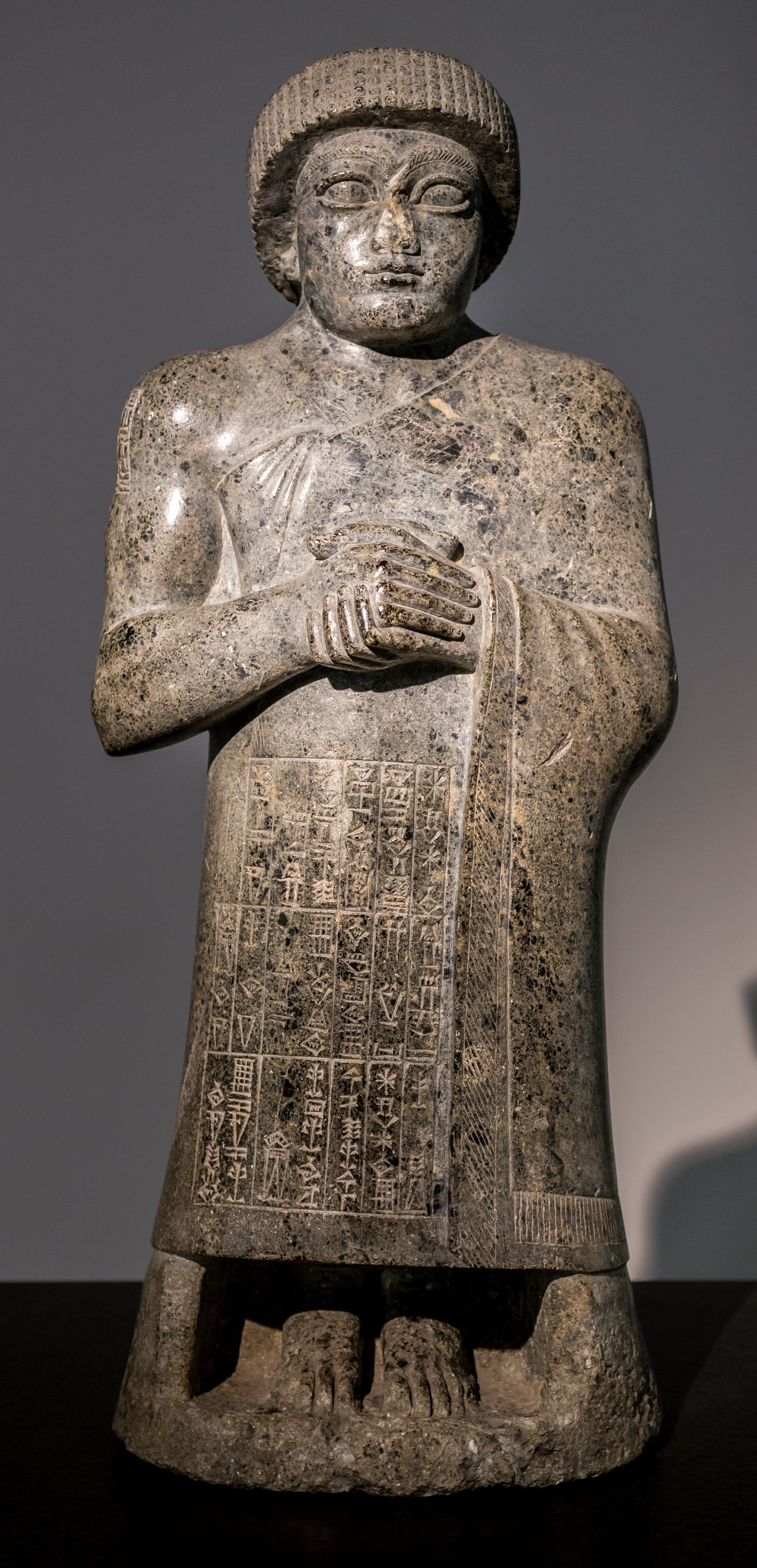
Statue of Gudea O; circa 2100 BC; steatite; height: 0.63 m; Ny Carlsberg Glyptotek (Copenhagen, Denmark)

=== Minoan ===
The greatest civilization of the Bronze Age was that of the Minoans, a mercantilist people who built a trading empire from their homeland of Crete and from other Aegean islands. Minoan civilization was known for its beautiful ceramics, but also for its frescos, landscapes, and stone carvings. In the early Minoan period, ceramics were characterized by spirals, triangles, curved lines, crosses, and fishbone motifs. In the middle Minoan period, naturalistic designs such as fish, squid, birds, and lilies were common. In the late Minoan period, flowers and animals were still the most characteristic, but variability had increased. The Palace Style of the region around Knossos is characterized by strong geometric simplification of naturalistic shapes and by monochromatic painting. The Palace at Knossos was decorated with frescoes that showed aspects of daily life, including court rituals and entertainment such as bull-leaping and boxing. The Minoans were skilled goldsmiths who created beautiful pendants and masks. The famous "Malia Pendant" of the Minoan times, found at Chryssolakkos and now on display at the Heraklion Archaeological Museum, is an example of high-quality gold-smithery.

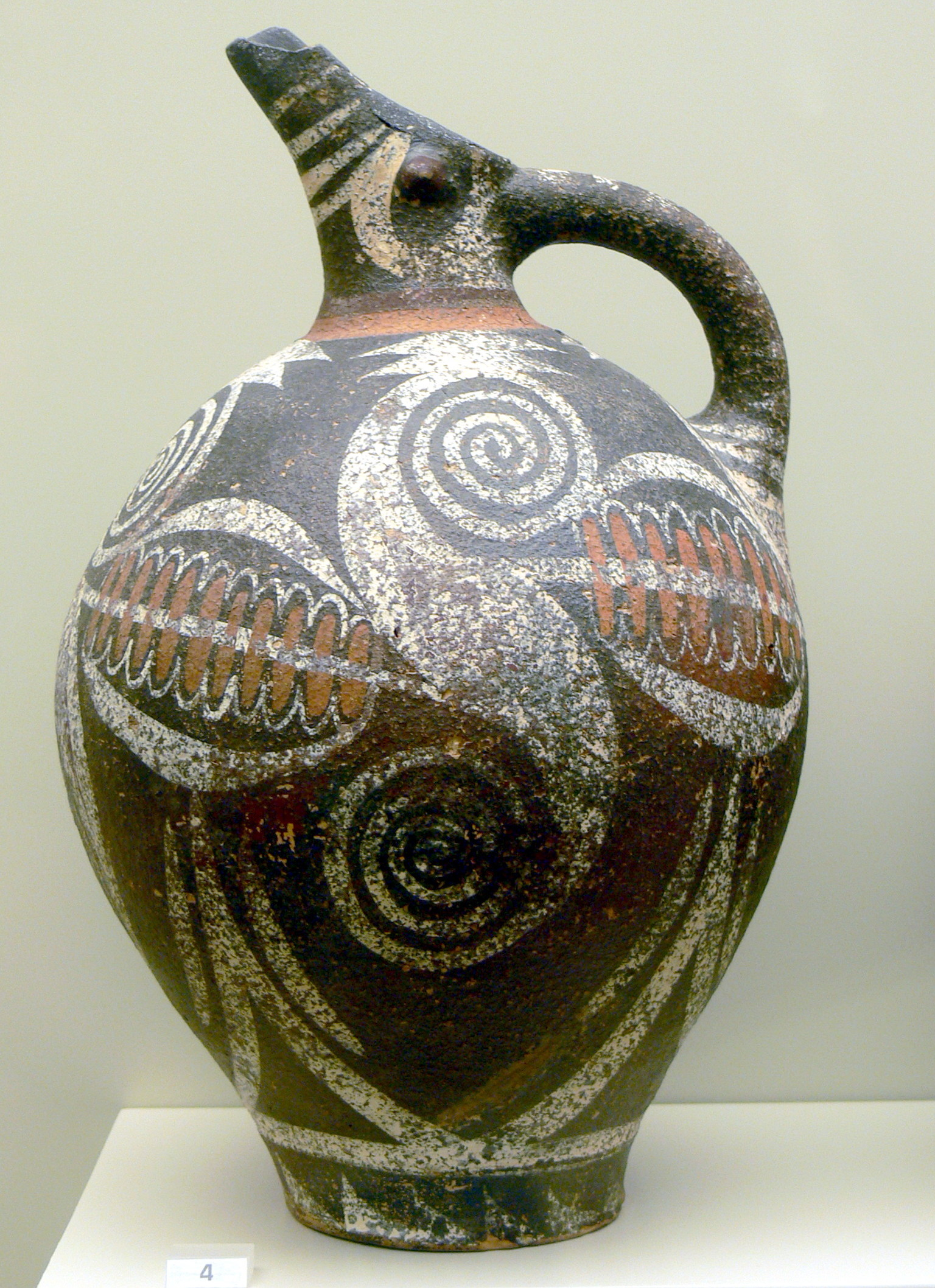
Kamares ware beaked jug; 1850-1675 BC; ceramic; height: 27 cm; from Phaistos (Crete, Greece); Heraklion Archaeological Museum (Greece)

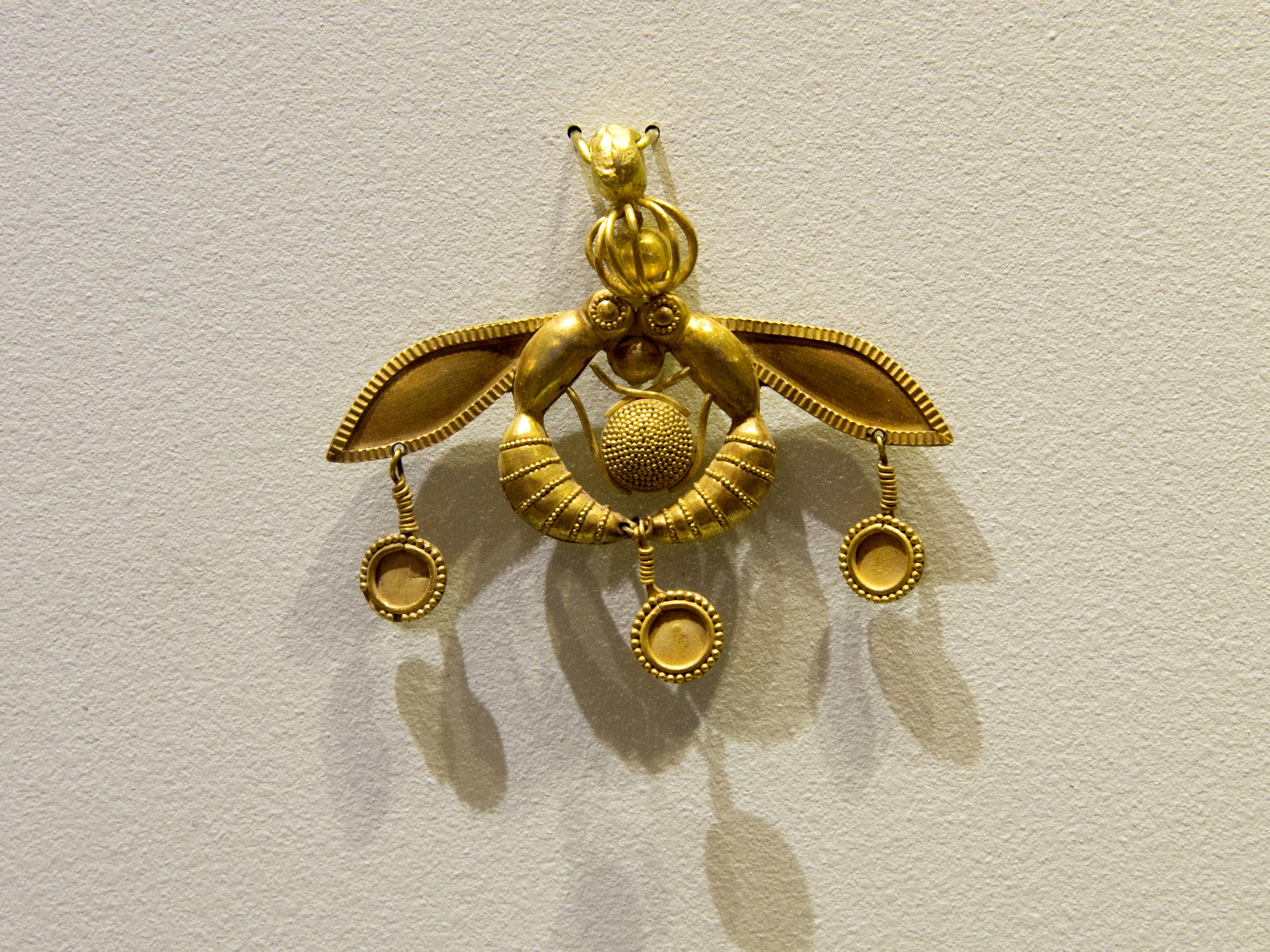
The Malia Pendant, an iconic Minoan jewel; 1700-1600 BC; gold; width: 4.6 cm; from Chrysolakkos (gold pit) complex at Malia; Archaeological Museum of Heraklion

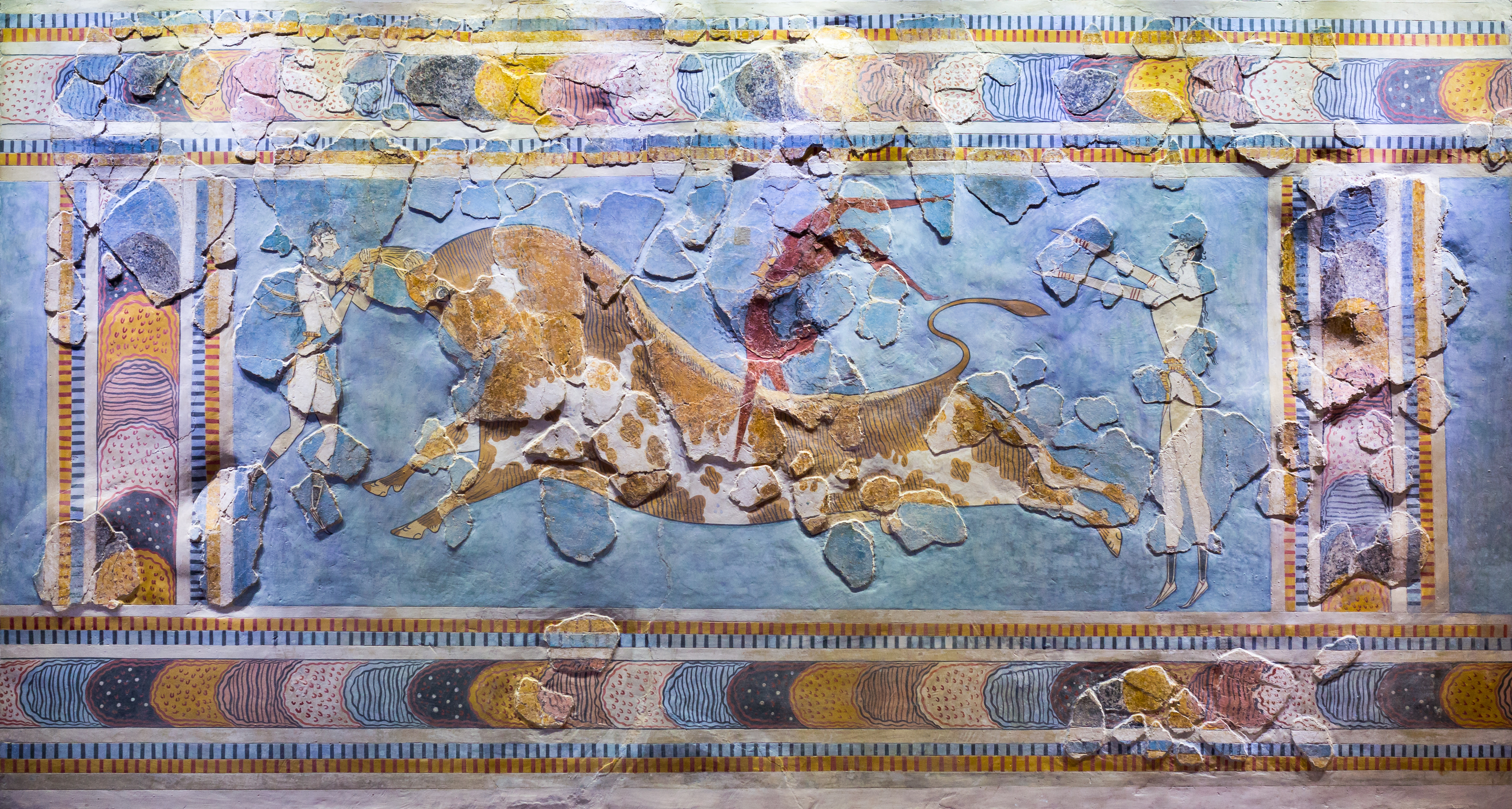
The fresco named the Bull-Leaping Fresco; 1675-1460 BC; lime plaster; height: 0.8 m, width: 1 m; from the palace at Knossos (Crete); Heraklion Archaeological Museum

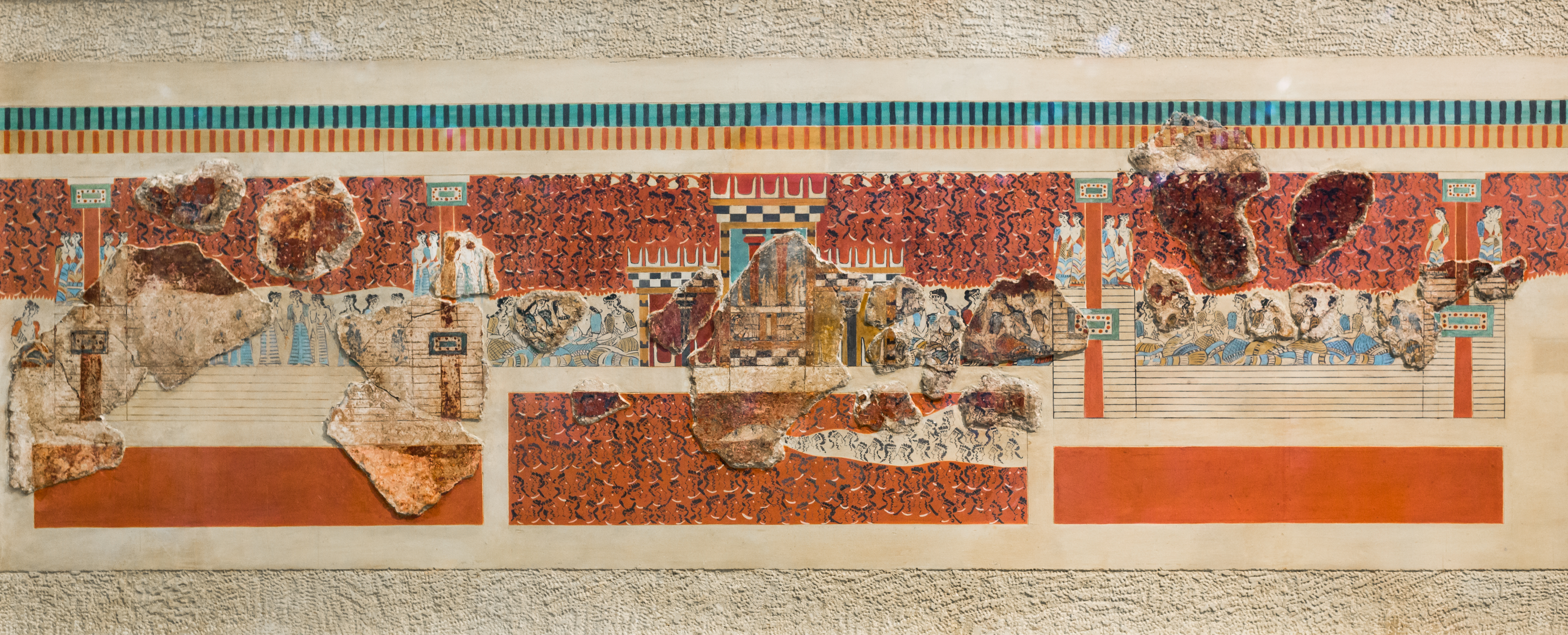
The Grandstand Fresco; 1675-1460 BC; lime plaster; height (without border): 26 cm; from the Palace of Knossos; Heraklion Archaeological Museum

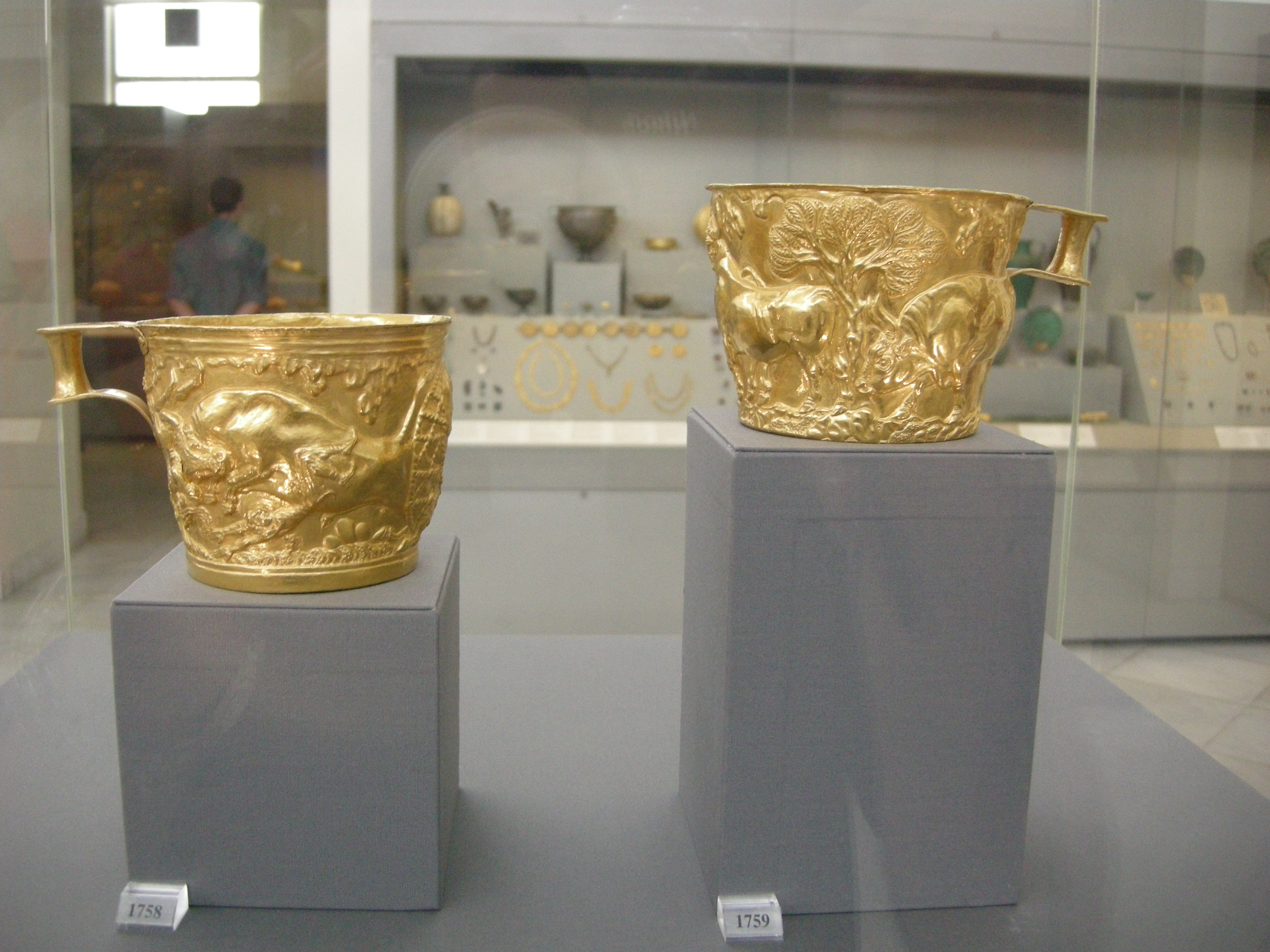
The Vaphio Cups; 1675-1410 BC; gold; height: 7.8 cm, diameter: 10.7 cm; from Vaphio (Laconia, Greece); National Archaeological Museum (Athens)

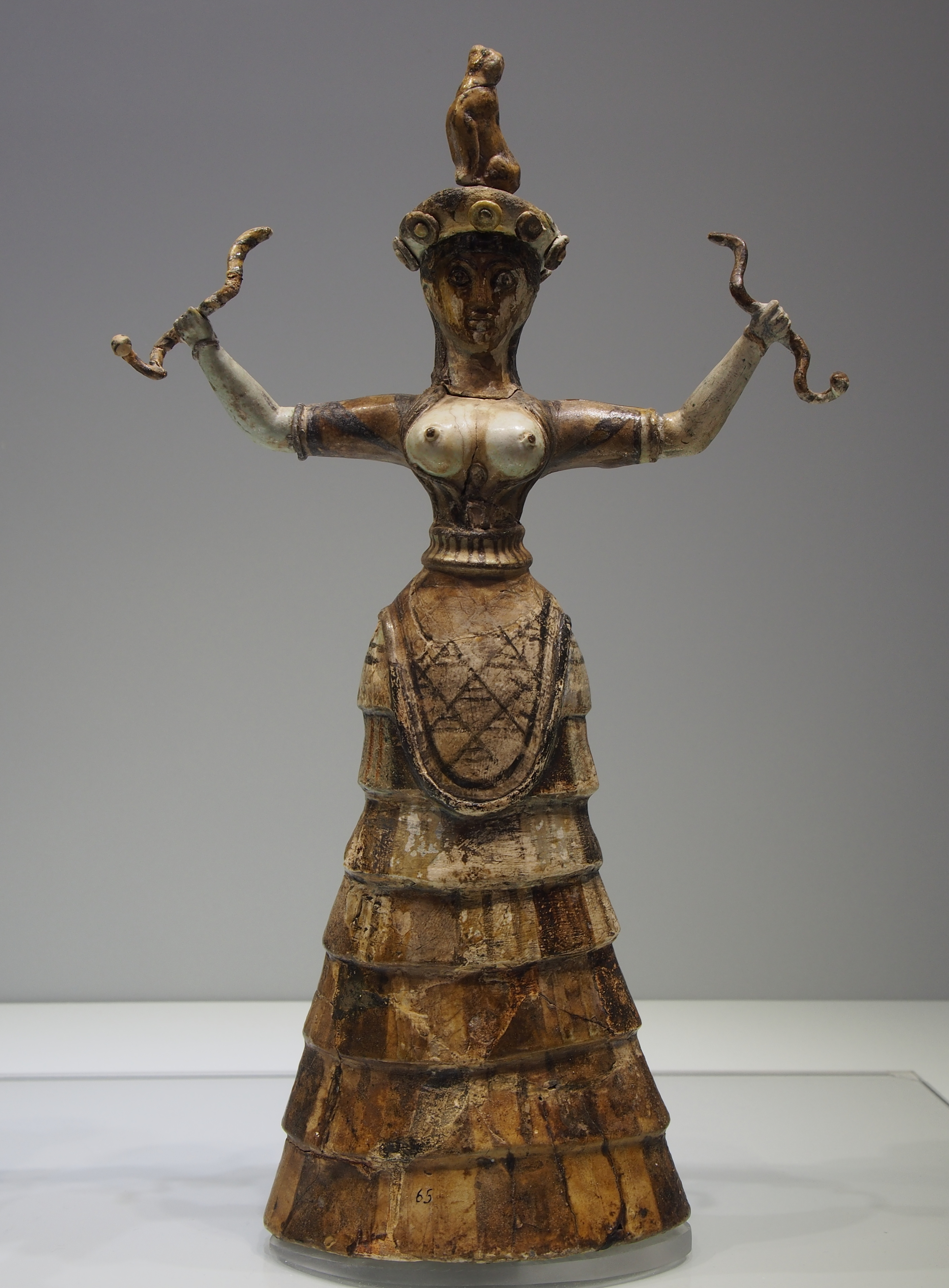
Snake goddess; 1460-1410 BC (from the Minoan Neo-palatial Period); faience; height: 29.5 cm; from the Temple Repository at Knossos; Heraklion Archaeological Museum

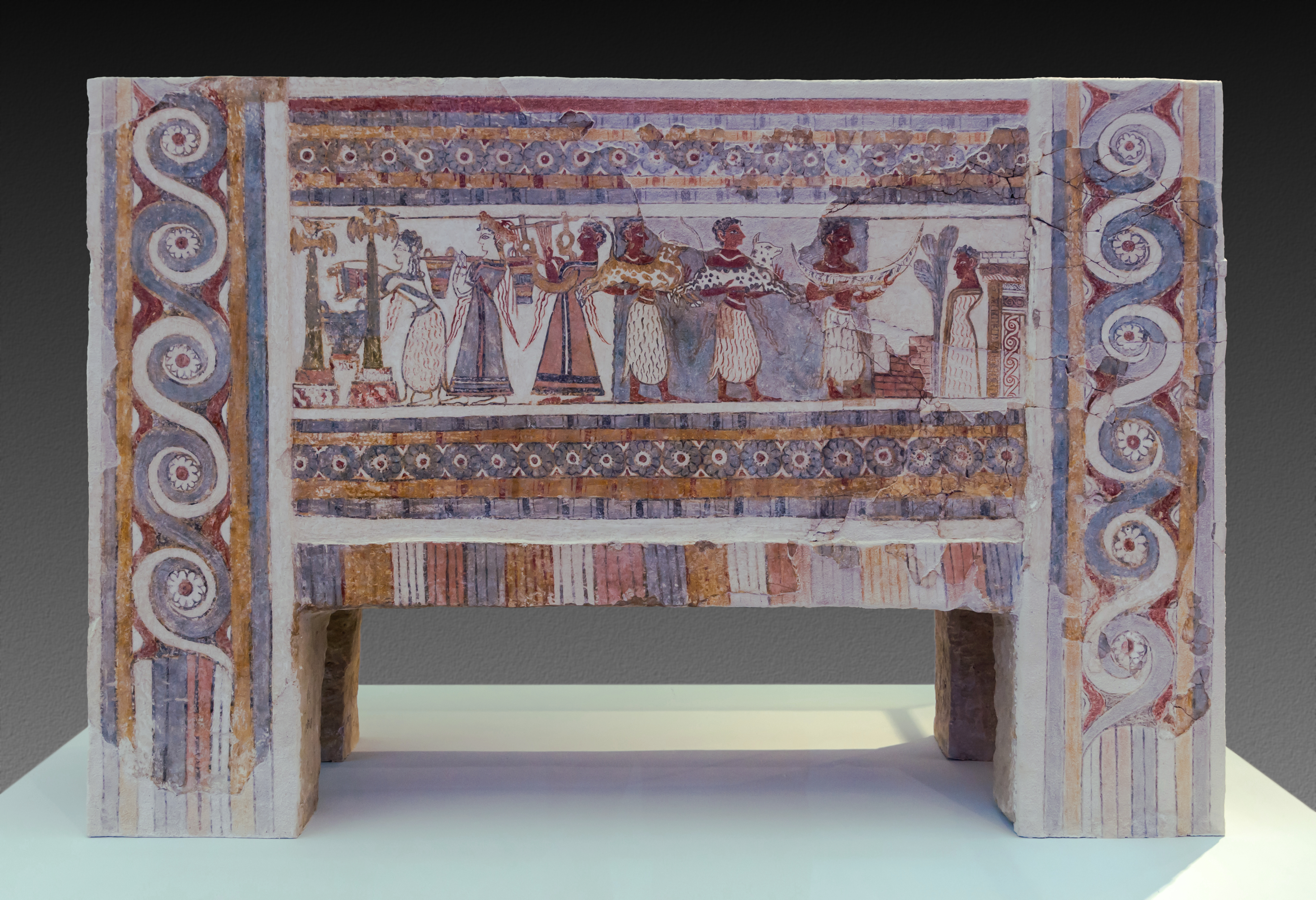
The Hagia Triada sarcophagus; 1370-1315 BC; limestone; length: 1.4 m, height: 0.9 m; from Chamber Tomb 4 at Hagia Triada, near Phaistos (Crete); Heraklion Archaeological Museum

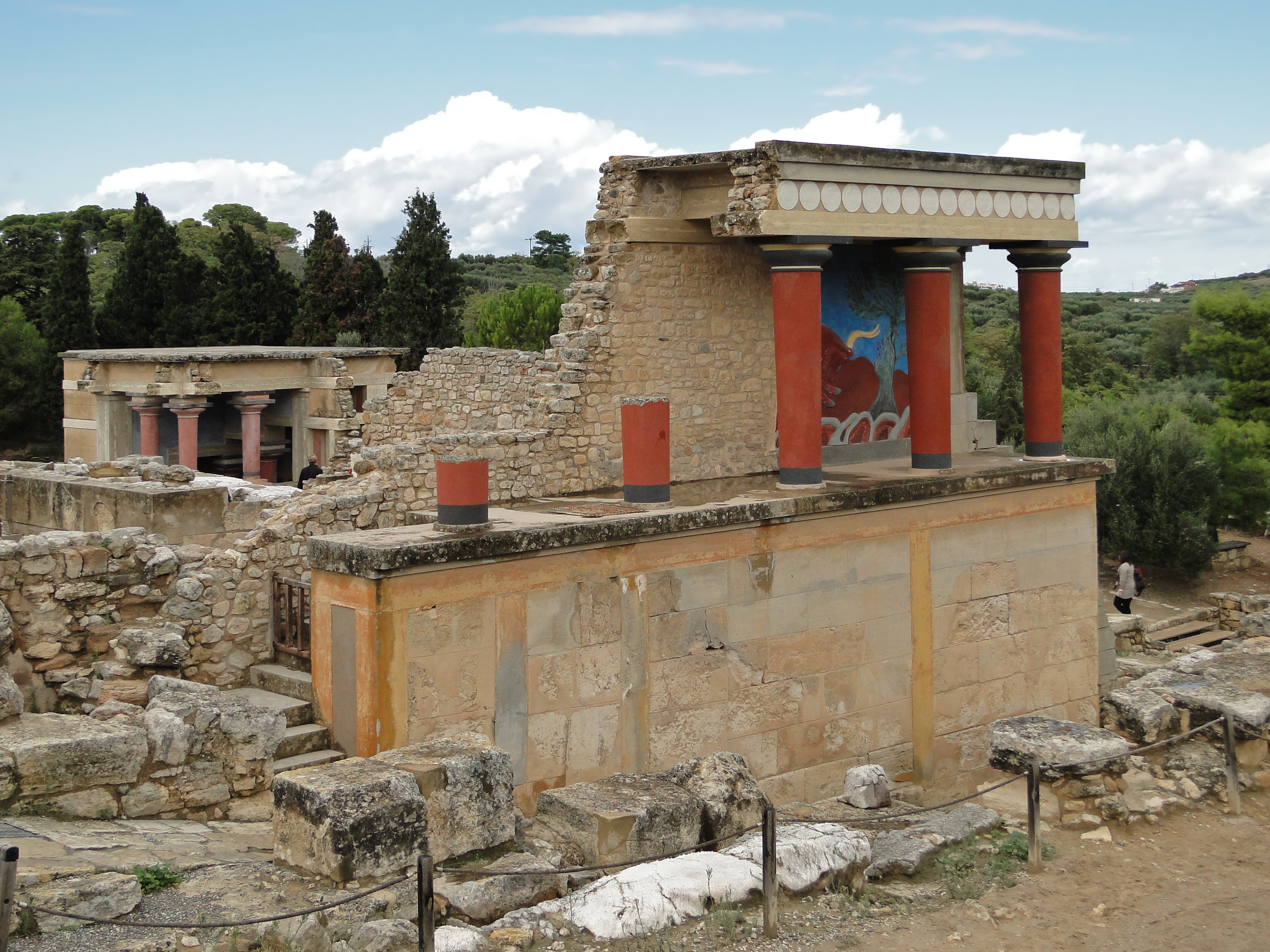
The restored North Entrance of the Knossos Palace Complex with a charging bull fresco

=== Mycenaean ===
Mycenaean art is close to the Minoan and includes many splendid finds from the royal graves, most famously the Mask of Agamemnon, a gold funeral mask. As may be seen from this item, the Mycenaeans specialized in gold working. Their artworks are known for a plethora of decorative motifs employed. At some point in their cultural history, the Mycenaeans adopted the Minoan goddesses and associated these goddesses with their sky god; scholars believe that the Greek pantheon of deities does not reflect Mycenaean religion except for the goddesses and Zeus. These goddesses, however, are Minoan in origin.

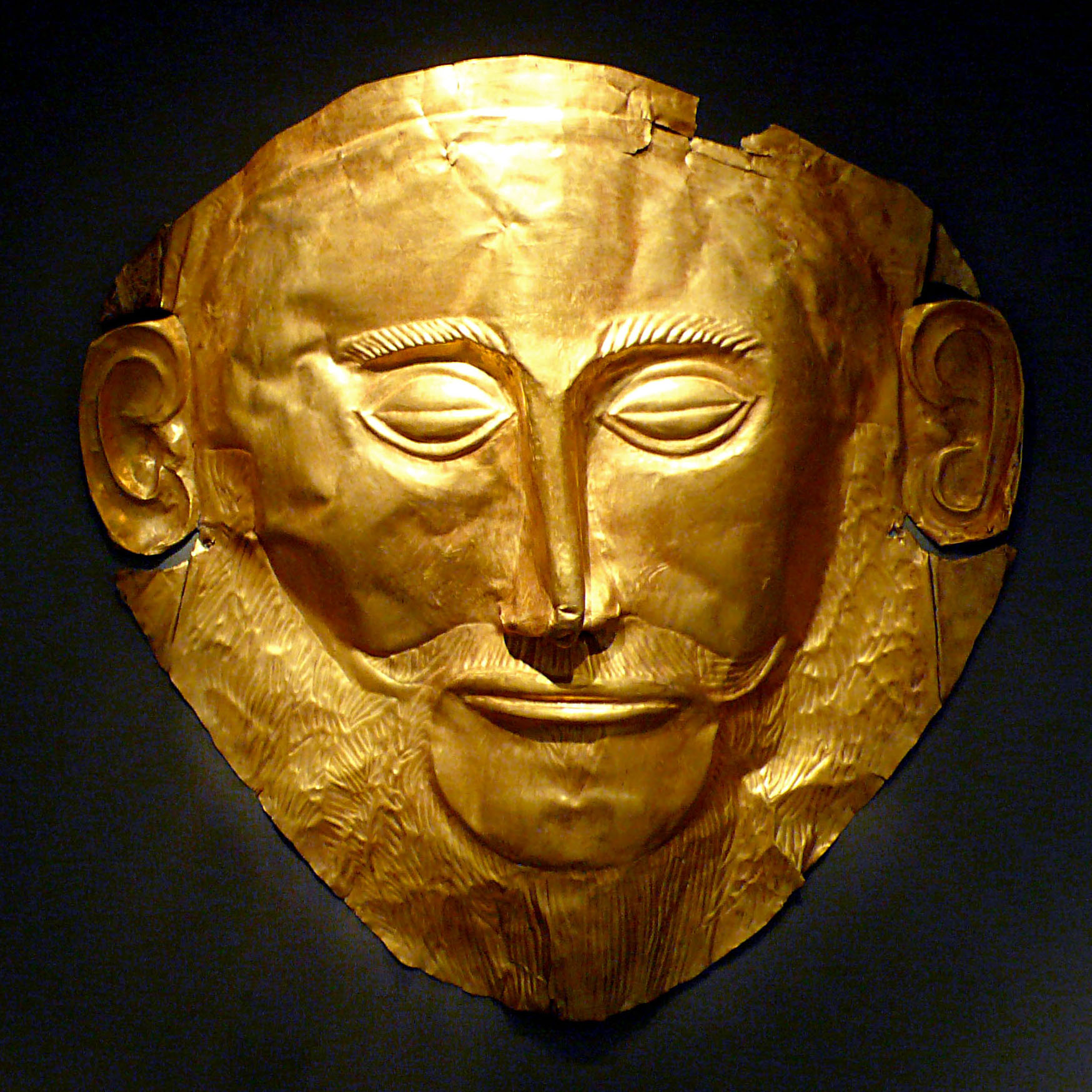
The Mask of Agamemnon, the most iconic Mycenaean artwork; 1675-1600 BC; gold; height: 25 cm, width: 27 cm, weight: 169 g; National Archaeological Museum (Athens)

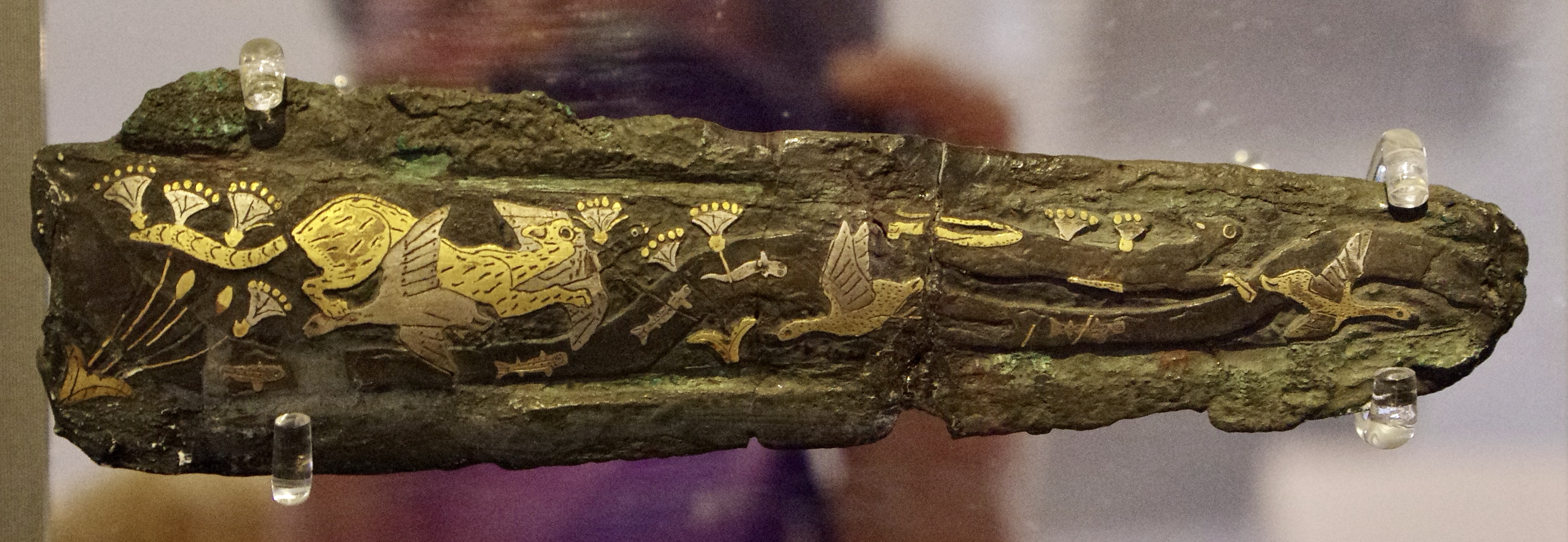
Inlaid dagger; 1550-1500 BC; bronze, silver, gold and niello; length: 16 cm; National Archaeological Museum (Athens)

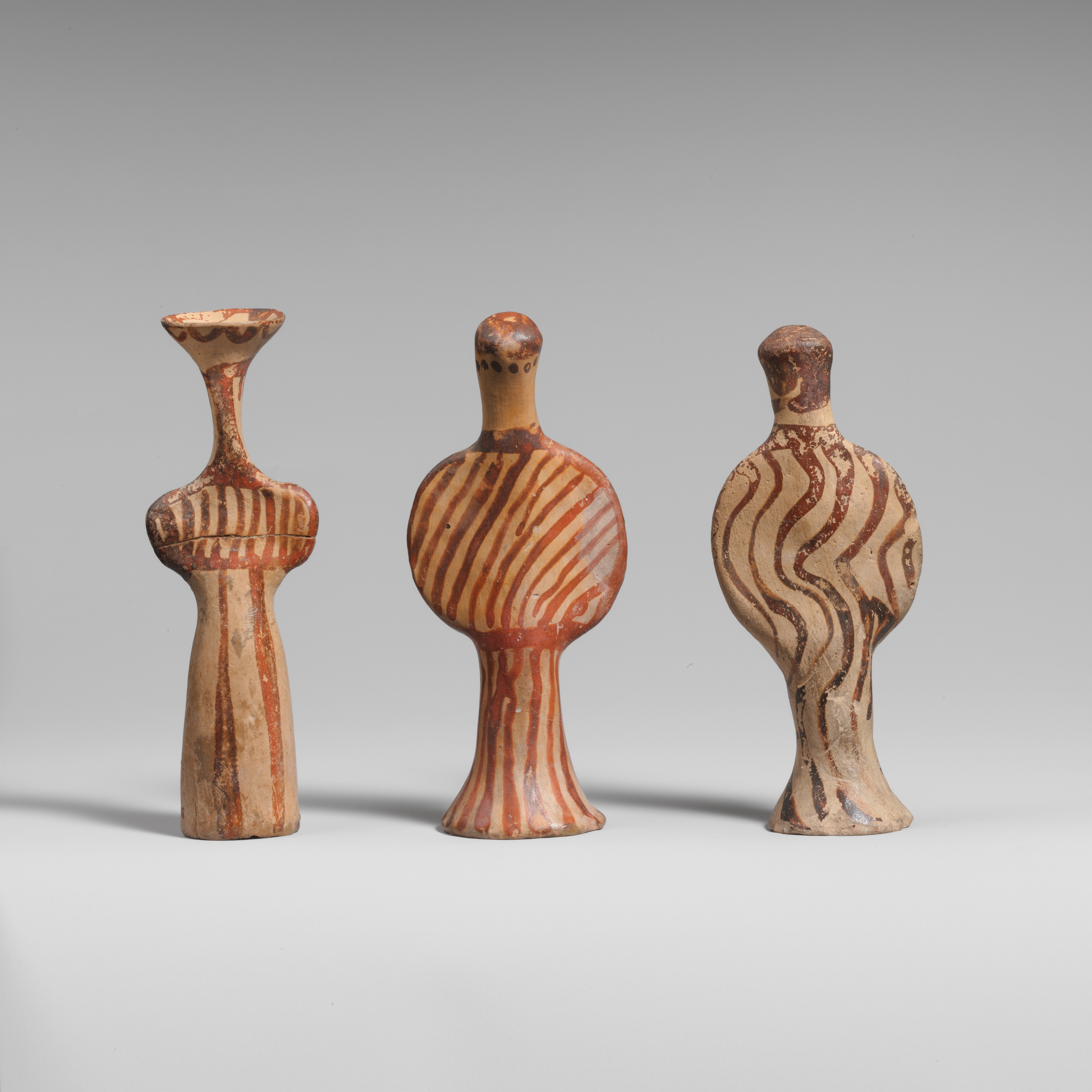
Three female figures; 1400-1300 BC; terracotta; heights: 10.8 cm, 10.8 cm and 10.5 cm; Metropolitan Museum of Art (New York City)

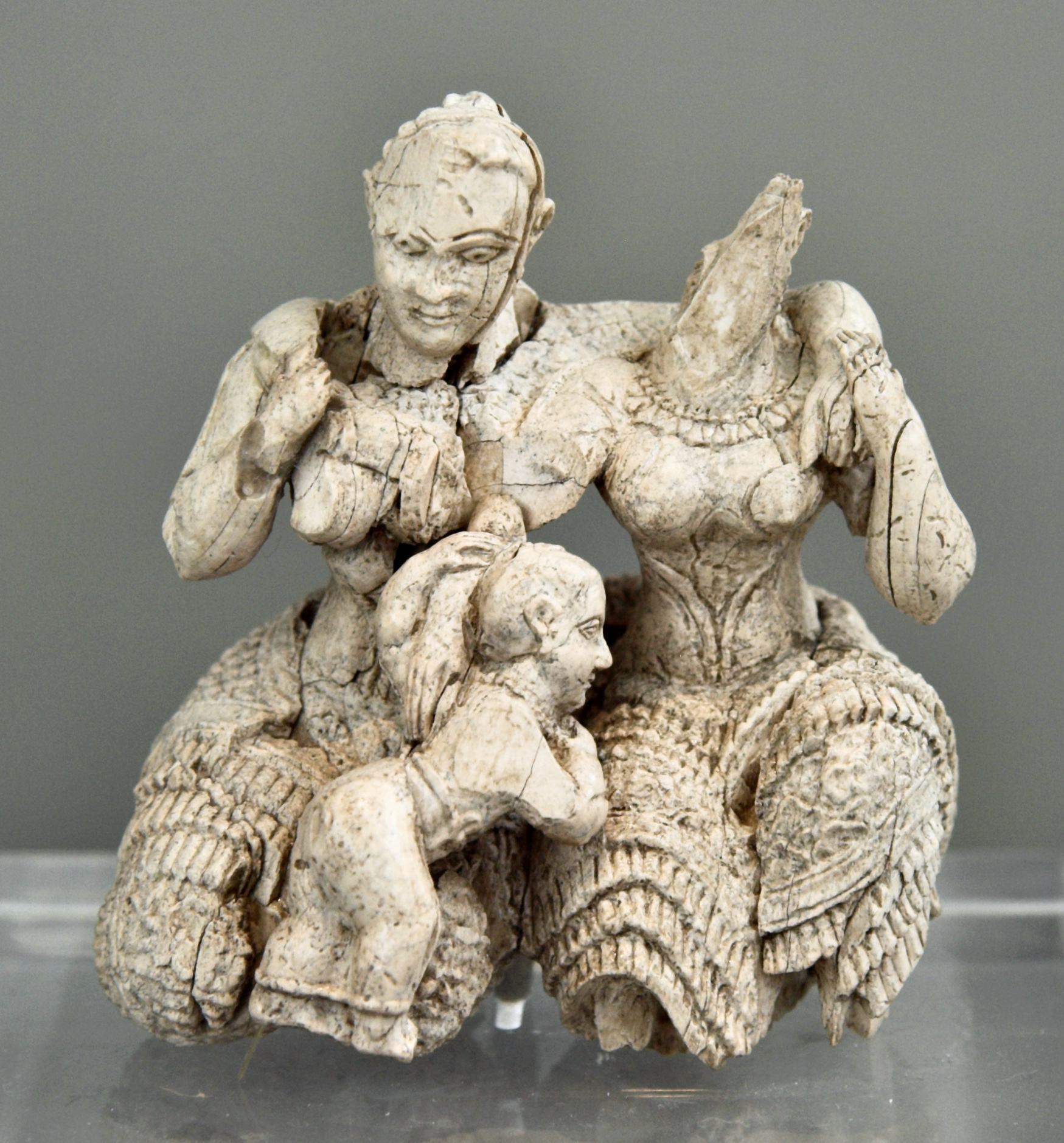
Two women and a child; 1400-1300 BC; ivory; height: 7.8 cm; National Archaeological Museum (Athens)

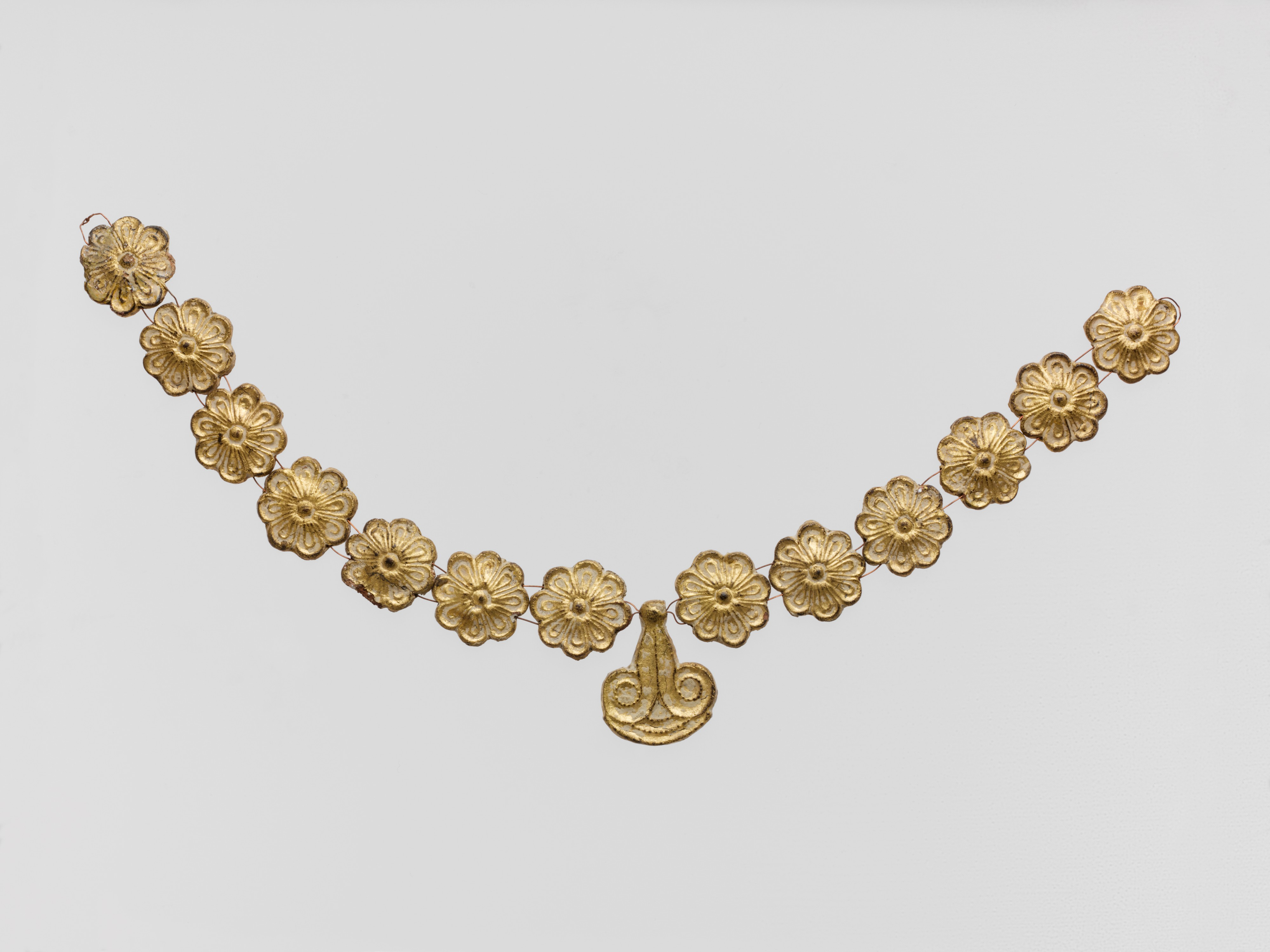
Necklace; 1400-1050 BC; gilded terracotta; diameter of the rosettes: 2.7 cm, with variations of circa 0.1 cm, length of the pendant 3.7 cm; Metropolitan Museum of Art

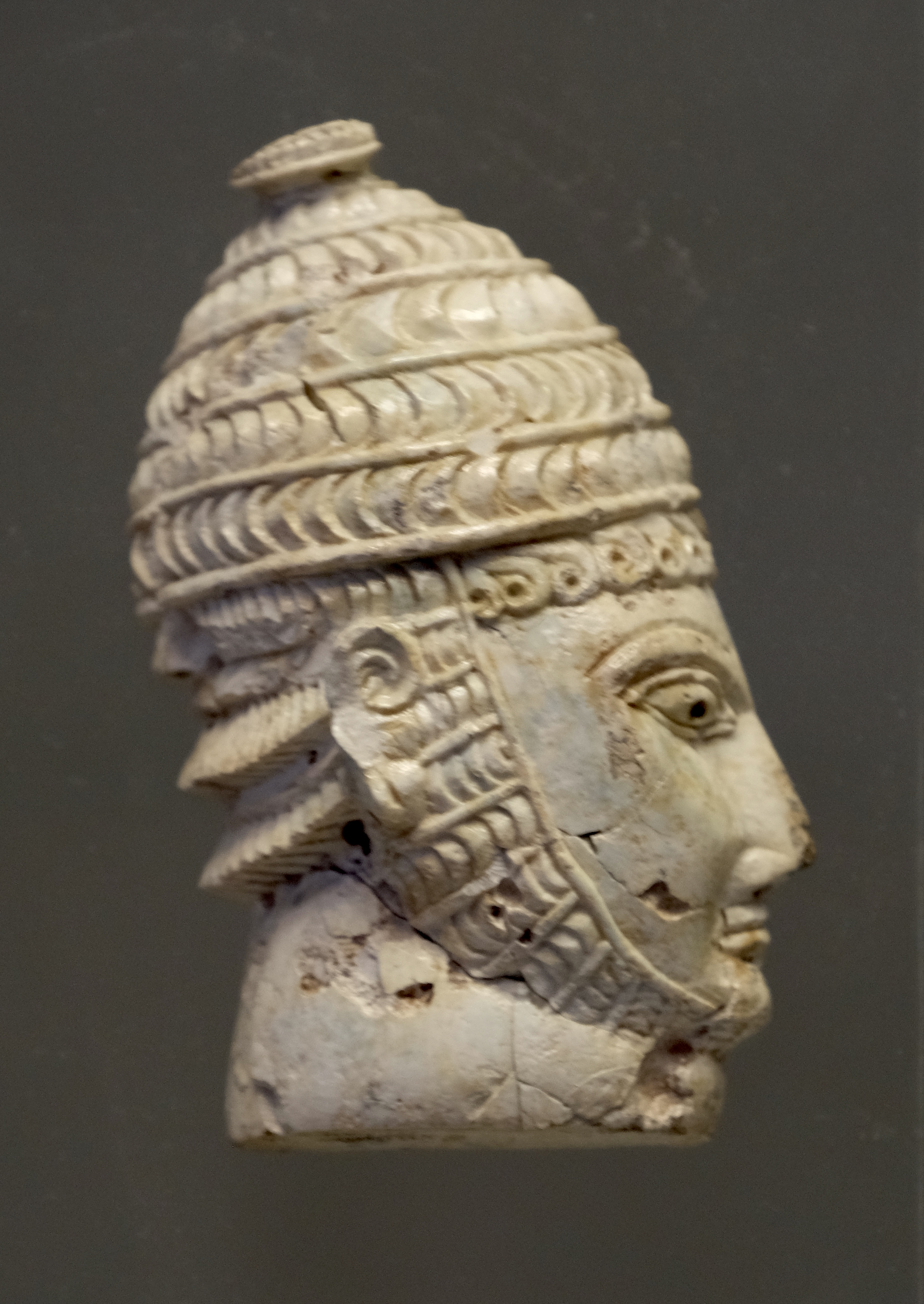
Head of a warrior; 1300-1200 BC; ivory; height: 8 cm; National Archaeological Museum (Athens)

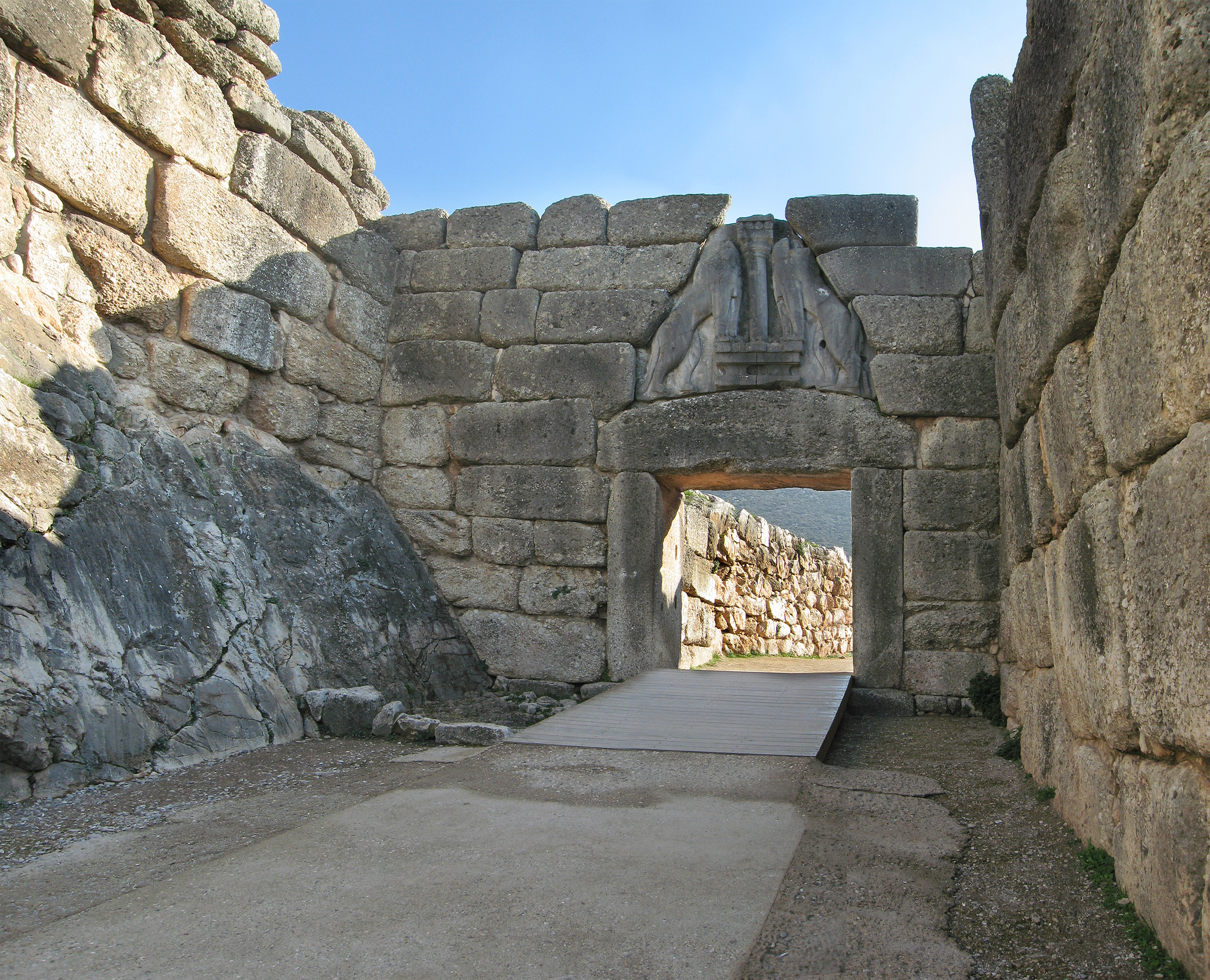
The Lion Gate, built in circa 1250 BC, an iconic Mycenaean building

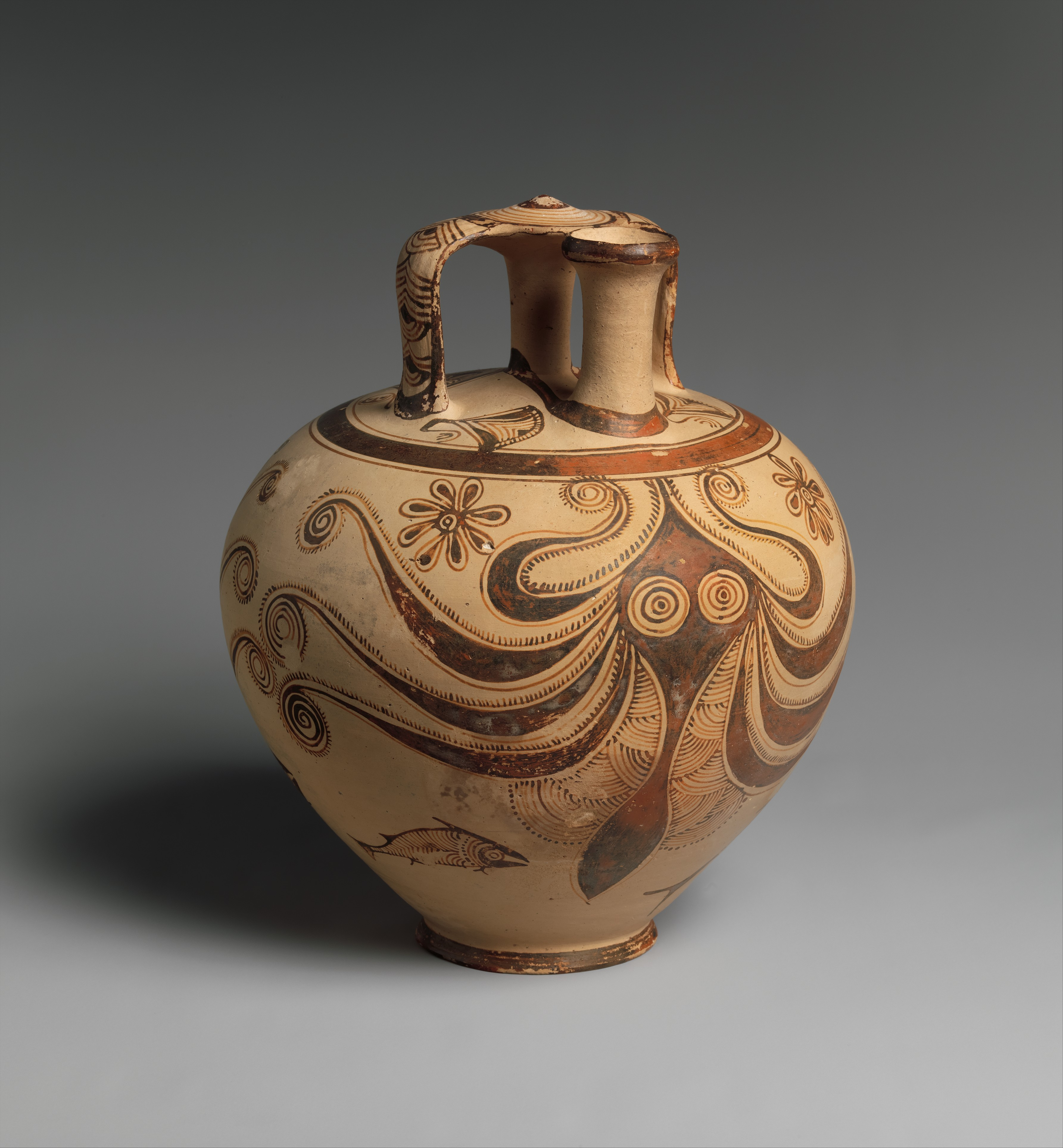
Stirrup jar with octopus; circa 1200-1100 BC; terracotta; height: 26 cm, diameter: 21.5 cm; Metropolitan Museum of Art

=== Persian ===
Achaemenid art includes frieze reliefs, metalwork, decoration of palaces, glazed brick masonry, fine craftsmanship (masonry, carpentry, etc.), and gardening. Most survivals of court art are monumental sculptures, above all the reliefs, double animal-headed Persian column capitals and other sculptures of Persepolis.

Although the Persians took artists, with their styles and techniques, from all corners of their empire, they produced not simply a combination of styles, but a synthesis of a new unique Persian style. Cyrus the Great in fact had an extensive ancient Iranian heritage behind him; the rich Achaemenid gold work, which inscriptions suggest may have been a specialty of the Medes, was for instance in the tradition of earlier sites.

There are a number of very fine pieces of jewellery or inlay in precious metal, also mostly featuring animals, and the Oxus Treasure has a wide selection of types. Small pieces, typically in gold, were sewn to clothing by the elite, and a number of gold torcs have survived.

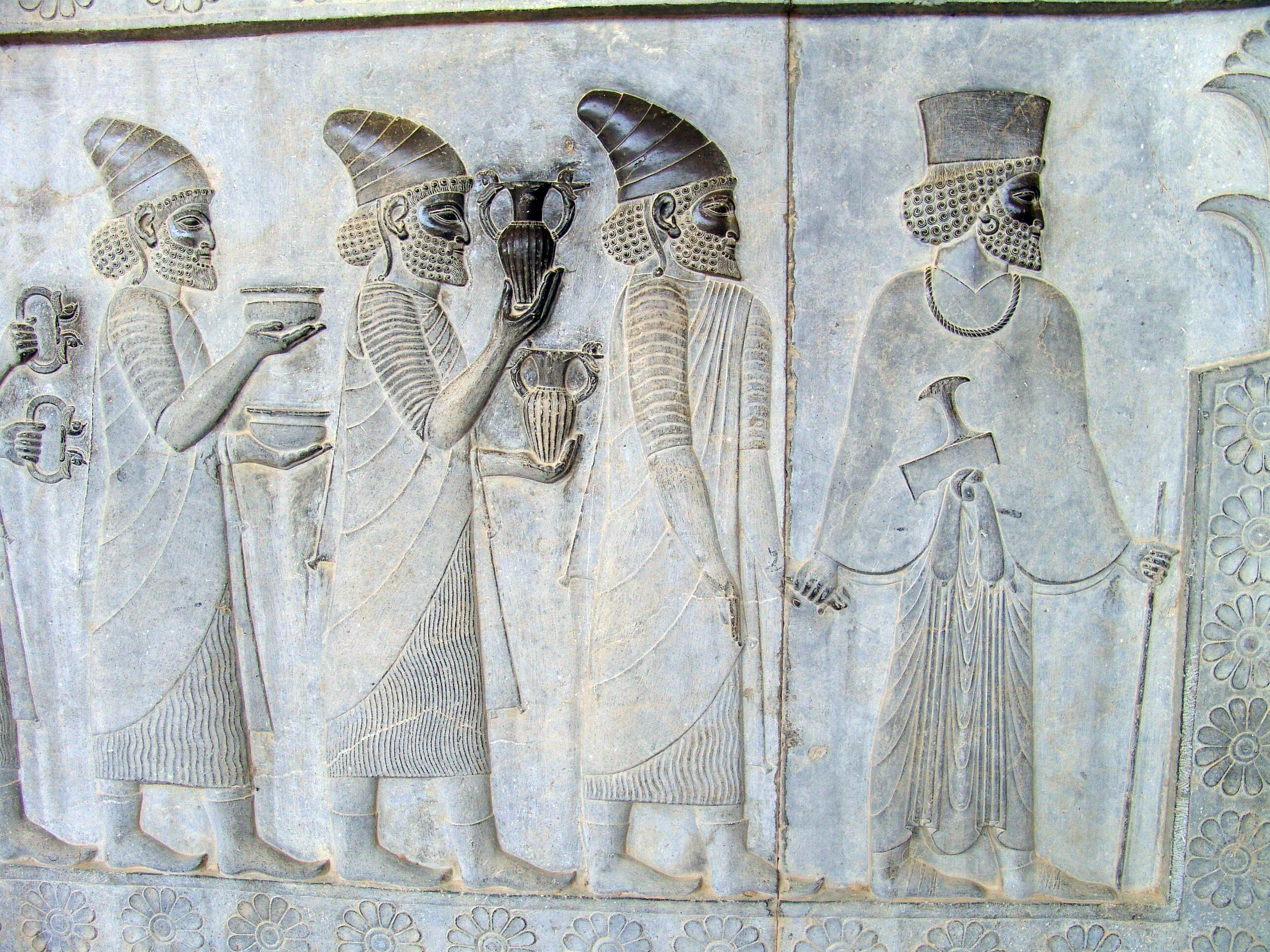
Relief from Persepolis (Iran) that represents people who carry bowls and amphoraes

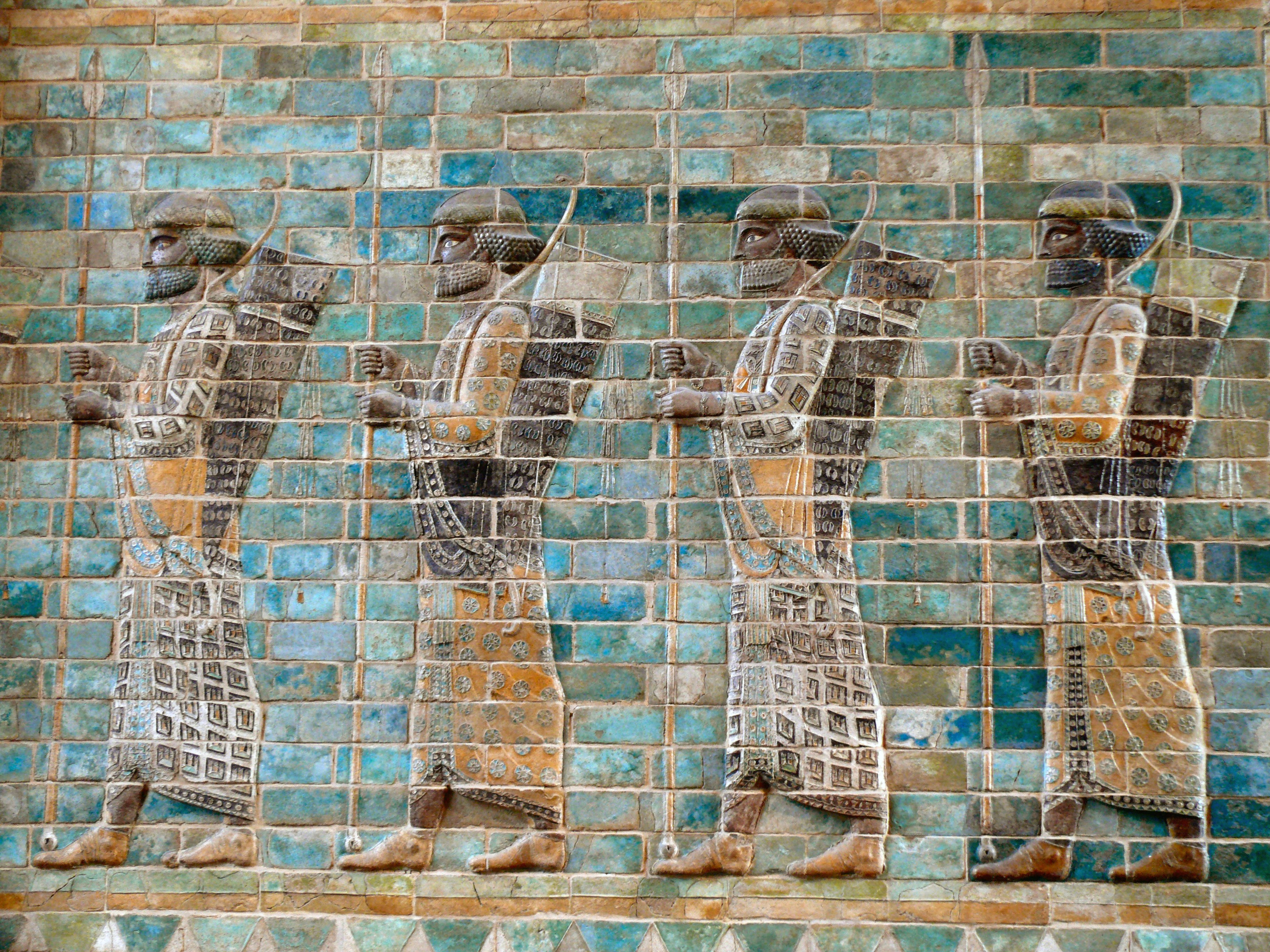
Frieze of archers; c. 510 BC; bricks; from the Palace of Darius at Susa; Louvre

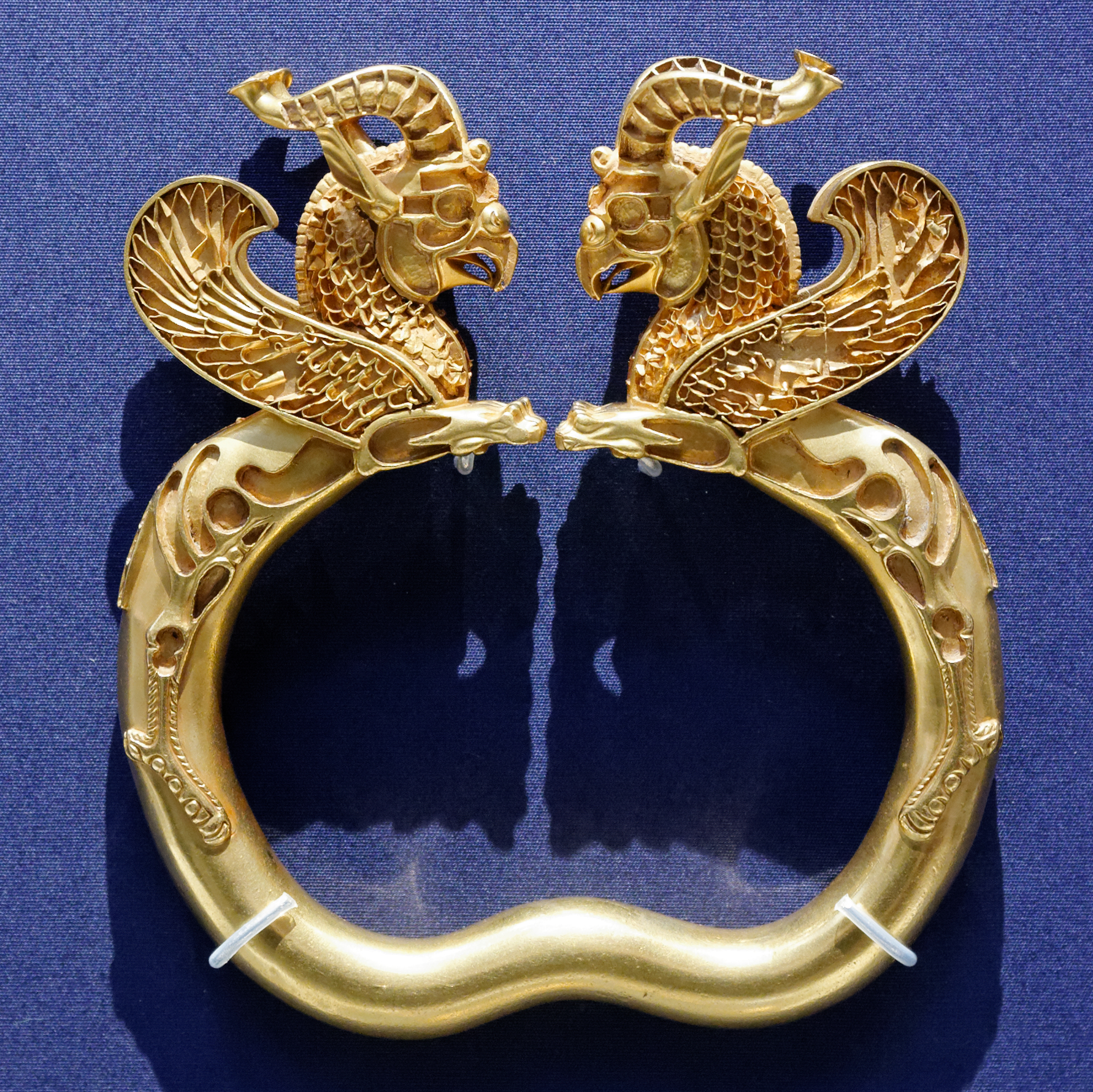
Gold bracelet, part of the Oxus Treasure; 5th to 4th century BC; gold; width: 11.6 cm; British Museum (London)

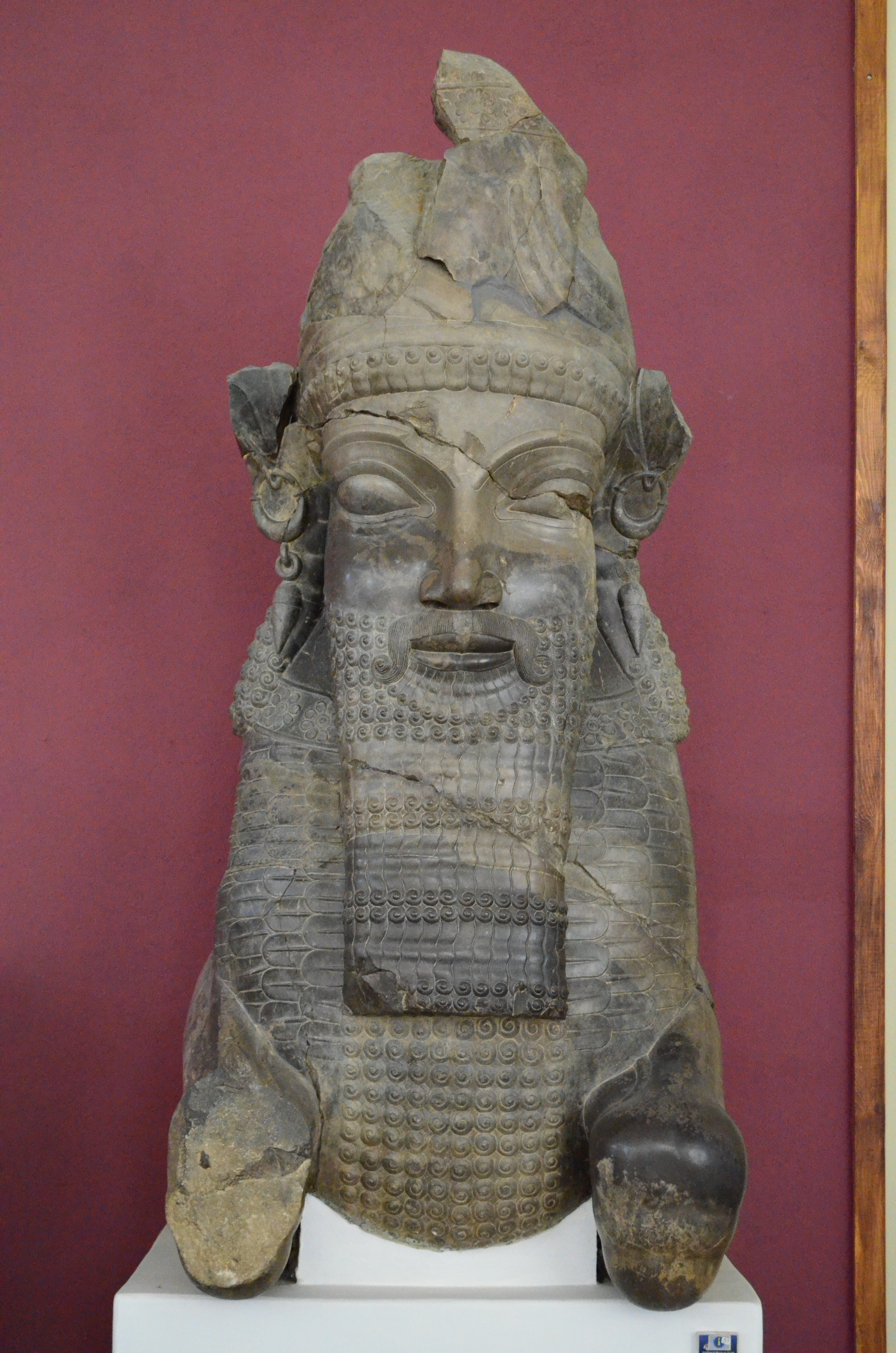
Column capital; 5th to 4th century BC; stone; height: 1.75 m; from Persepolis; National Museum of Iran (Teheran)

=== Phoenician ===
Phoenician art lacks unique characteristics that might distinguish it from its contemporaries. This is due to its being highly influenced by foreign artistic cultures: primarily Egypt, Greece, and Assyria. Phoenicians who were taught on the banks of the Nile and the Euphrates gained a wide artistic experience and finally came to create their own art, which was an amalgam of foreign models and perspectives. In an article from The New York Times published on January 5, 1879, Phoenician art was described by the following:

He entered into other men's labors and made most of his heritage. The Sphinx of Egypt became Asiatic, and its new form was transplanted to Nineveh on the one side and to Greece on the other. The rosettes and other patterns of the Babylonian cylinders were introduced into the handiwork of Phoenicia, and so passed on to the West, while the hero of the ancient Chaldean epic became first the Tyrian Melkarth, and then the Herakles of Hellas.

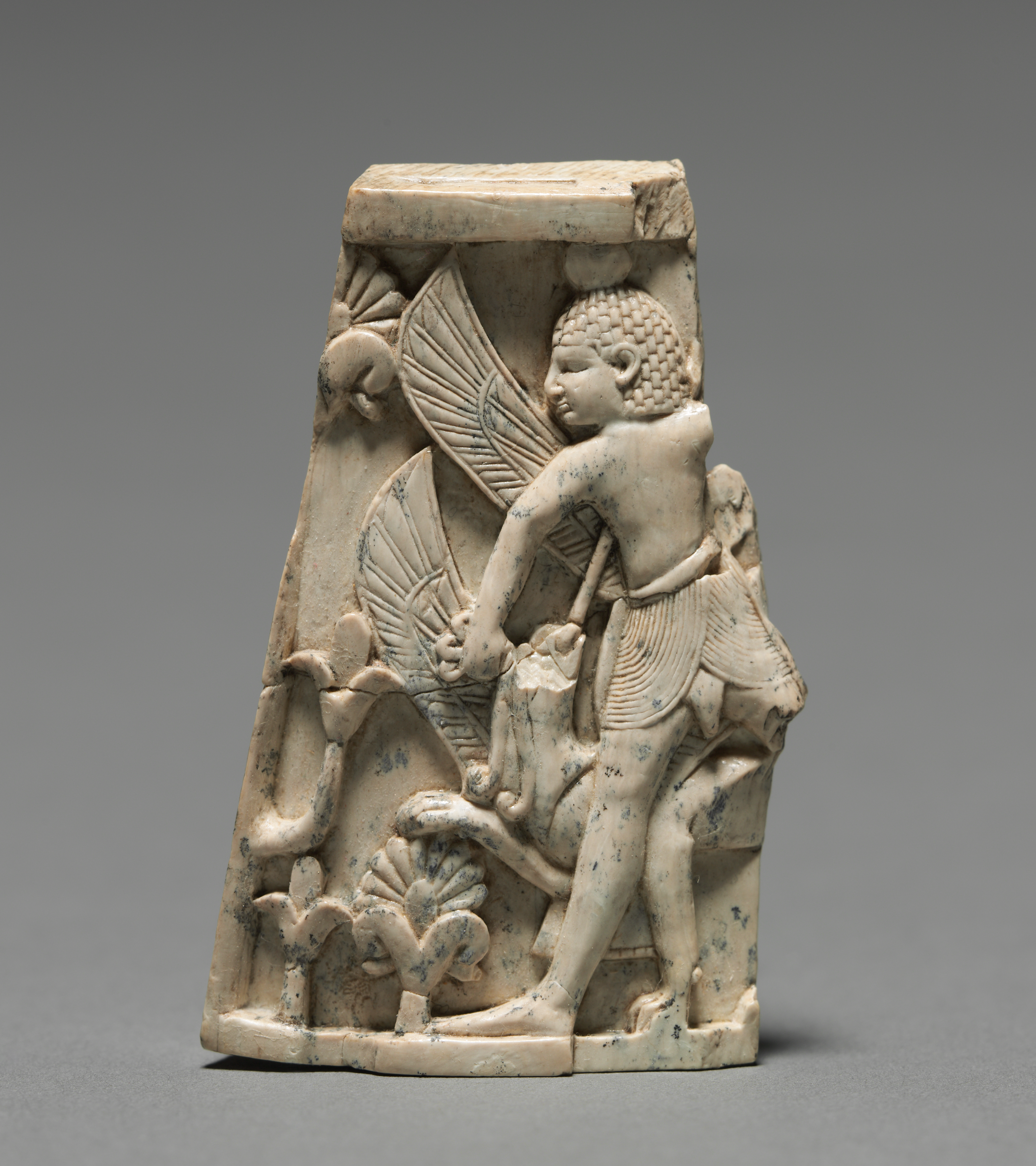
Decorative plaque which depicts a fighting of man and griffin; 900–800 BC; Nimrud ivories; Cleveland Museum of Art (Ohio, US)

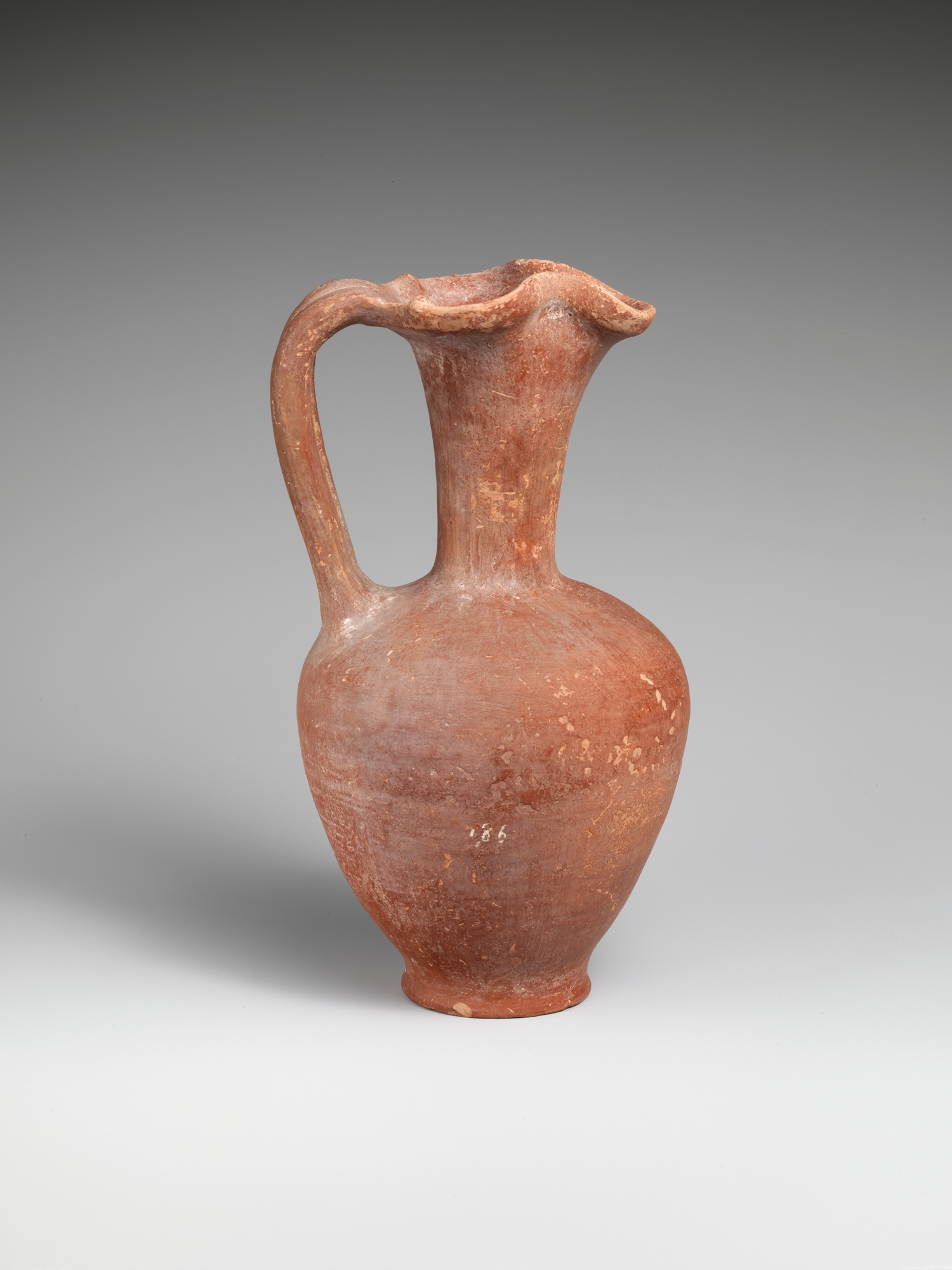
Oinochoe; 800-700 BC; terracotta; height: 24.1 cm; Metropolitan Museum of Art (New York City)

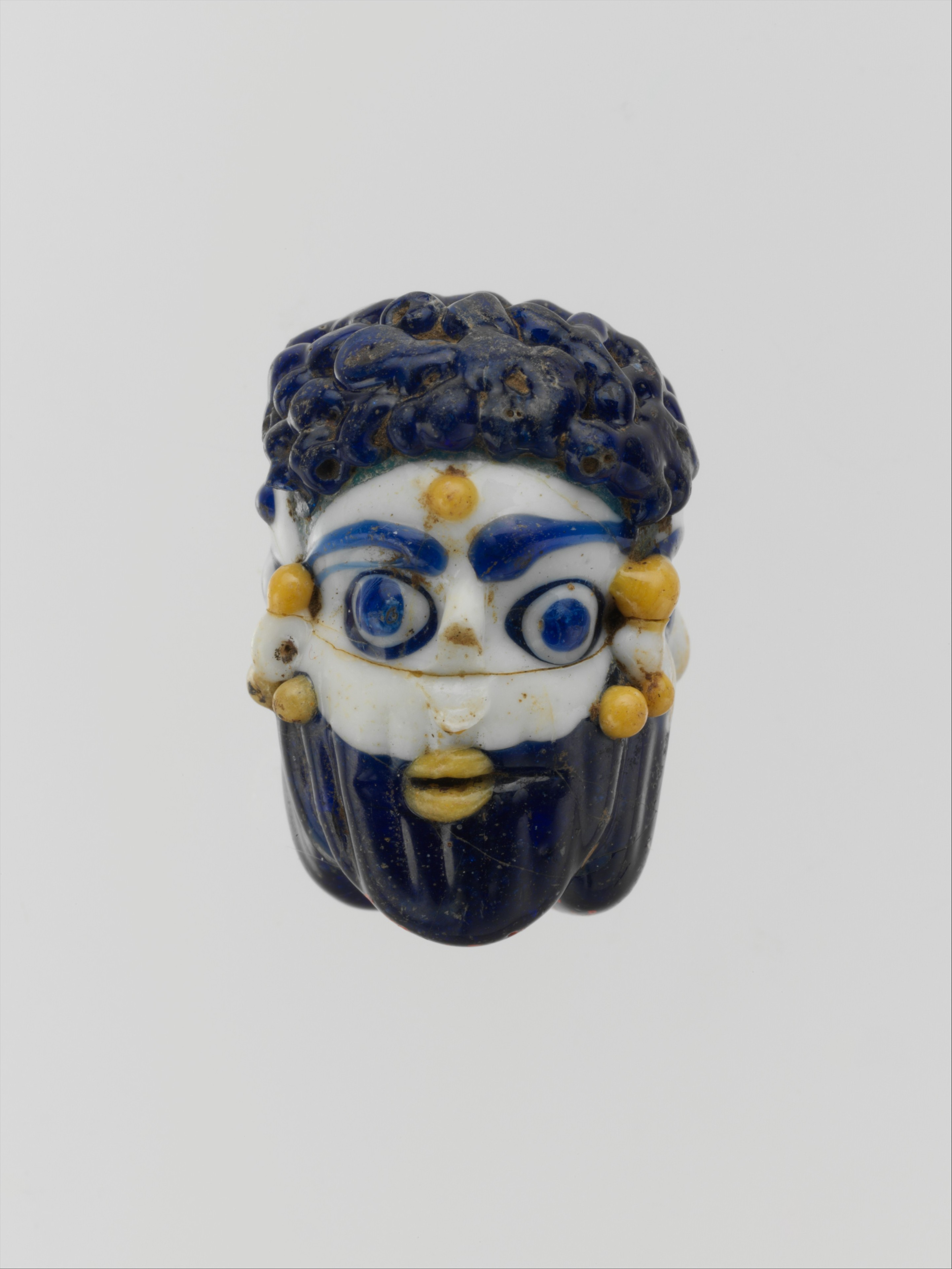
Face bead; mid-4th–3rd century BC; glass; height: 2.7 cm; Metropolitan Museum of Art

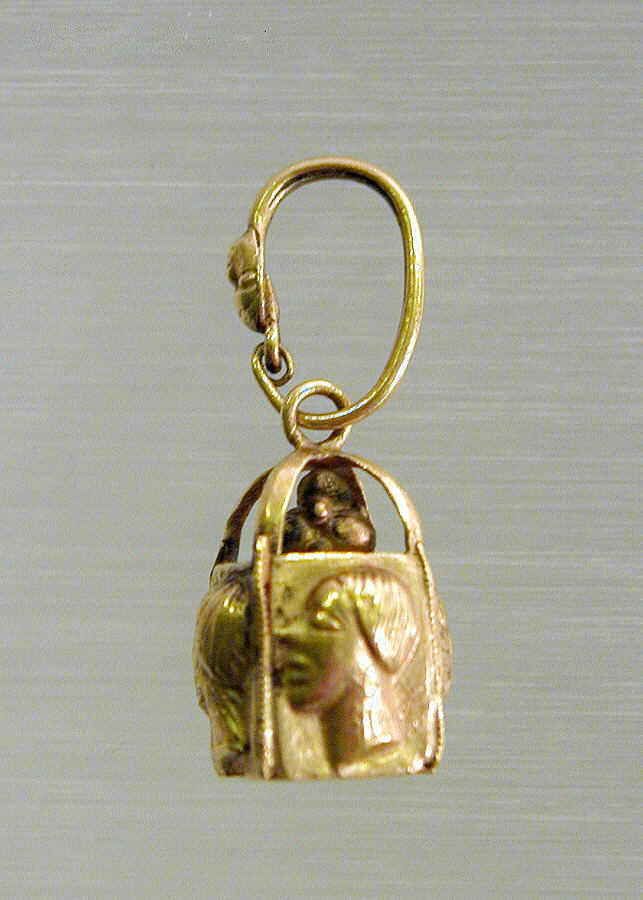
Earring from a pair, each with four relief faces; late 4th–3rd century BC; gold; overall: 3.5 x 0.6 cm; Metropolitan Museum of Art

=== Roman ===
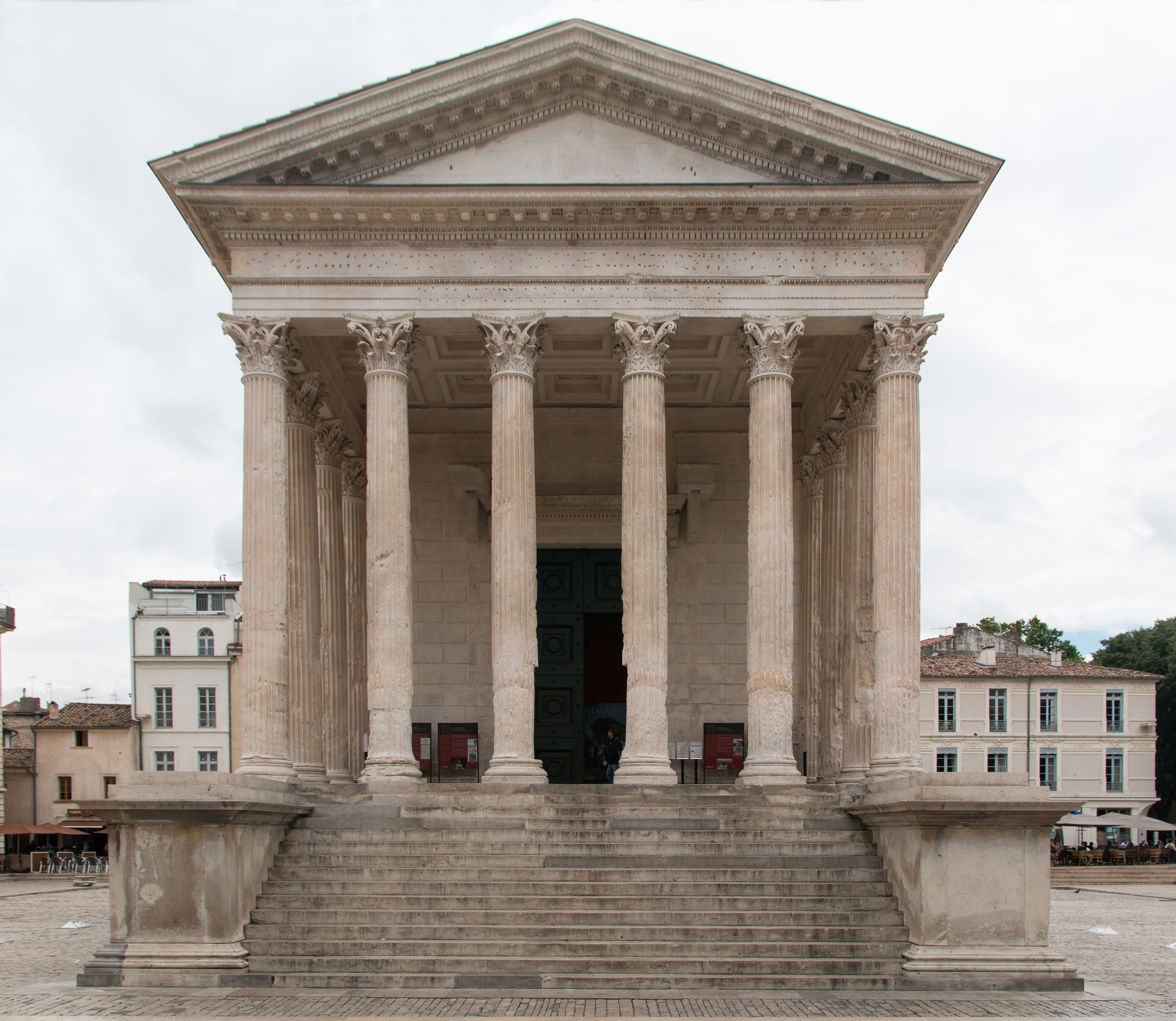
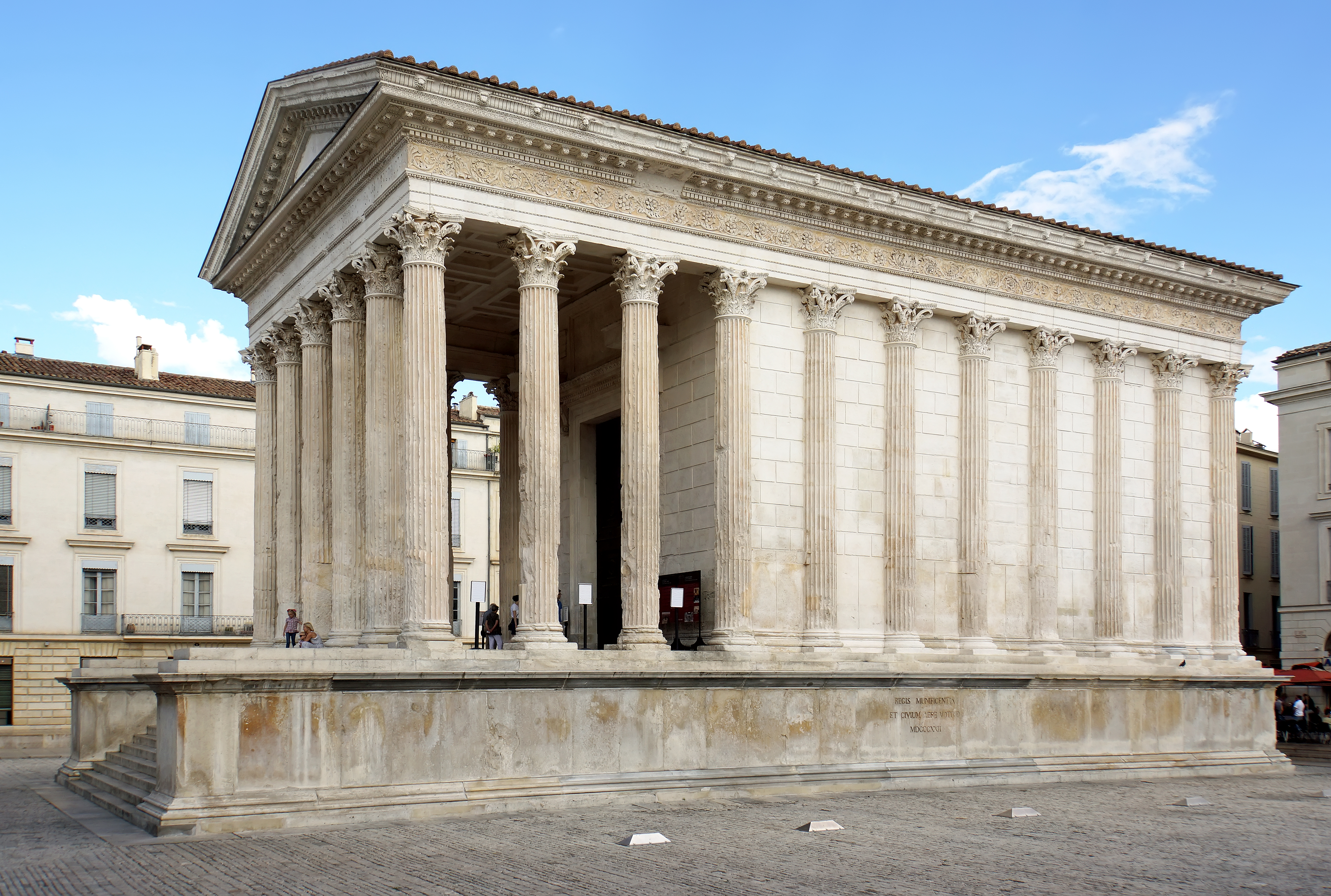
The Maison Carrée in Nîmes (France), one of the best conserved Ancient Roman temples, photoed from two angles

It is commonly said that Roman art was derivative of Greek and Etruscan art. Indeed, the villas of the wealthy Romans unearthed in Pompeii and Herculaneum show a strong predilection for all things Greek. Many of the most significant Greek artworks survive by virtue of their Roman interpretation and imitation. Roman artists sought to commemorate great events in the life of their state and to glorify their emperors as well as record the inner life of people, and express ideas of beauty and nobility. Their busts, and especially the images of individuals on gravestones, are very expressive and lifelike, finished with skill and panache.

In Greece and Rome, wall painting was not considered high art. The most prestigious form of art besides sculpture was panel painting, i.e. tempera or encaustic painting on wooden panels. Unfortunately, since wood is a perishable material, only a very few examples of such paintings have survived, namely the Severan Tondo from circa 200 AD, a very routine official portrait from some provincial government office, and the well-known Fayum mummy portraits, all from Roman Egypt, and almost certainly not of the highest contemporary quality. The portraits were attached to burial mummies at the face, from which almost all have now been detached. They usually depict a single person, showing the head, or head and upper chest viewed frontally. The background is always monochrome, sometimes with decorative elements. In terms of artistic tradition, the images clearly derive more from Greco-Roman traditions than Egyptian ones. They are remarkably realistic, though variable in artistic quality, and may indicate the similar art which was widespread elsewhere but did not survive. A few portraits painted on glass and medals from the later empire have survived, as have coin portraits, some of which are considered very realistic as well. Pliny the Younger complained of the declining state of Roman portrait art, "The painting of portraits which used to transmit through the ages the accurate likenesses of people, has entirely gone out [...] Indolence has destroyed the arts."

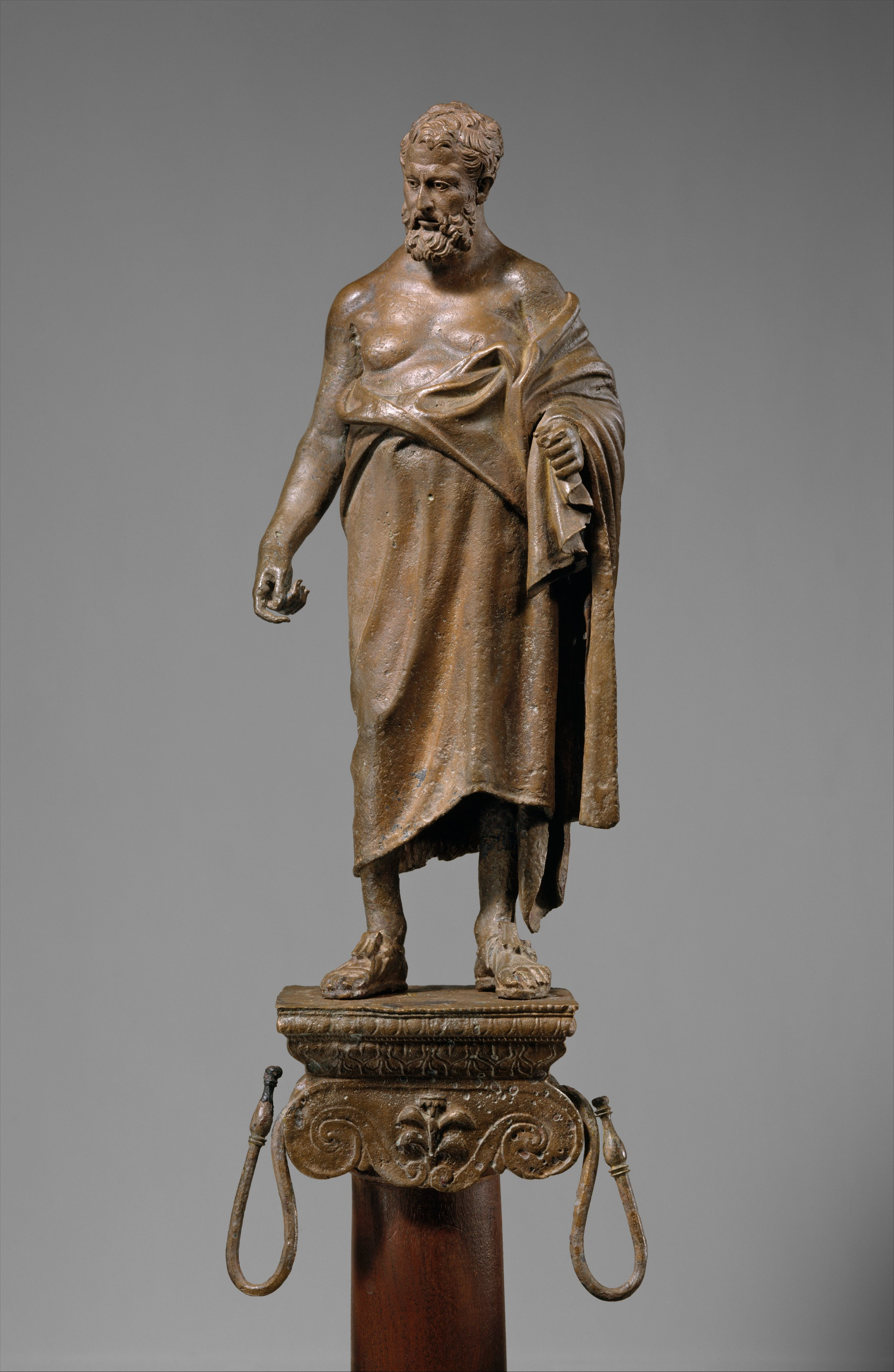
Bronze statuette of a philosopher on a lamp stand; late 1st century BC; bronze; overall: 27.3 cm; weight: 2.9 kg; Metropolitan Museum of Art (New York City)

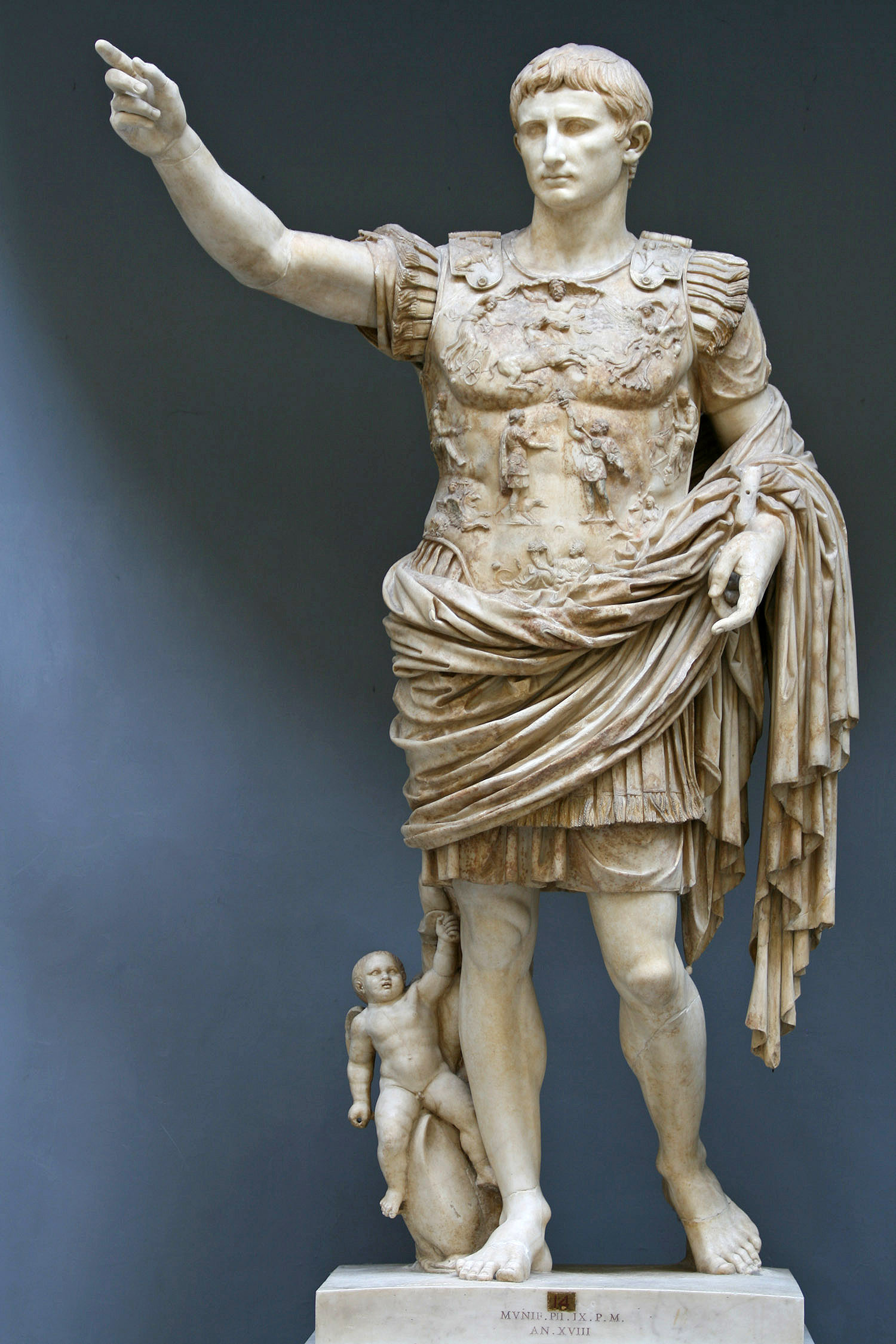
Augustus of Prima Porta; circa 20 BC; white marble; height: 2.06 m; Vatican Museums (Vatican City)

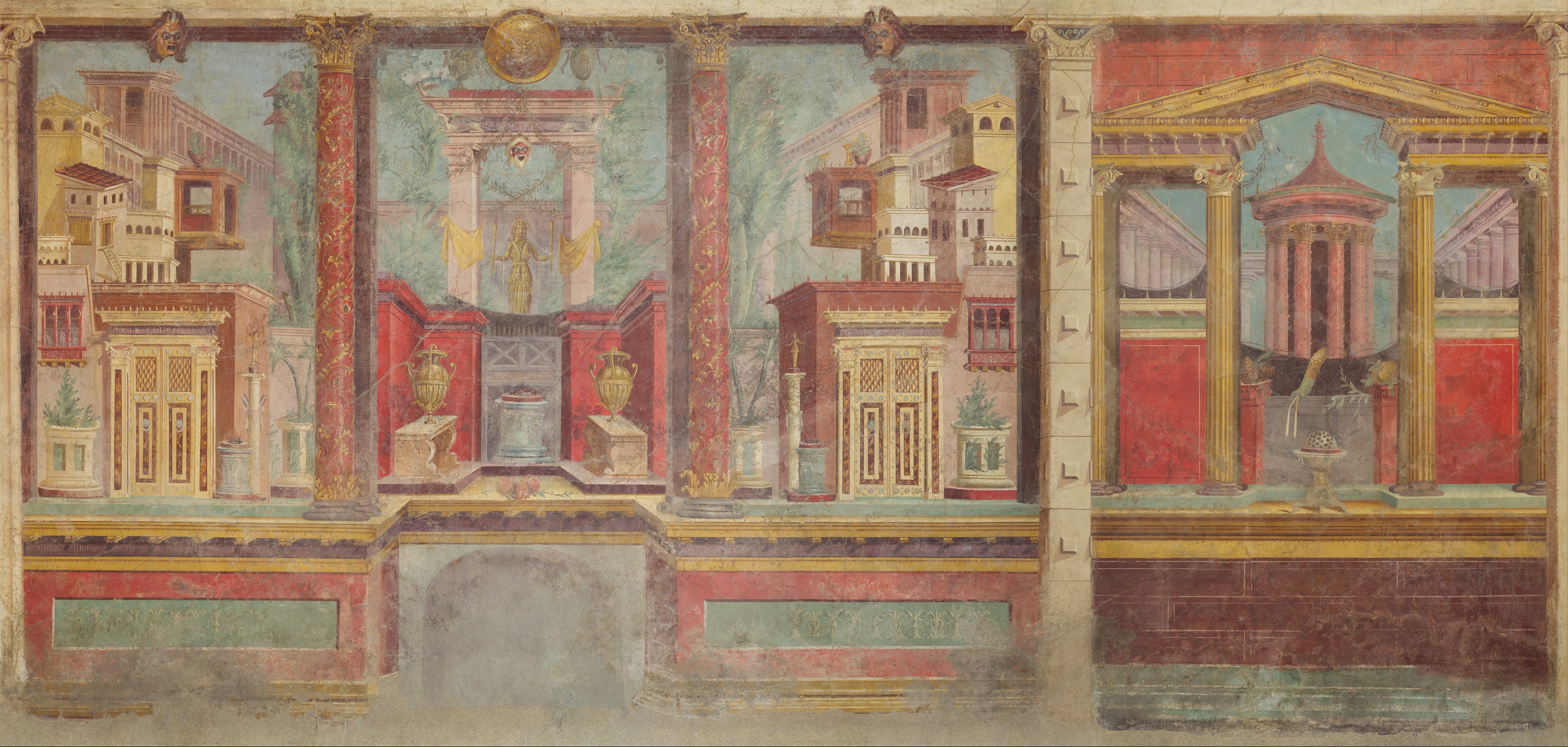
Restoration of a fresco from an Ancient villa bedroom; 50-40 BC; dimensions of the room: 265.4 x 334 x 583.9 cm; Metropolitan Museum of Art (New York City)

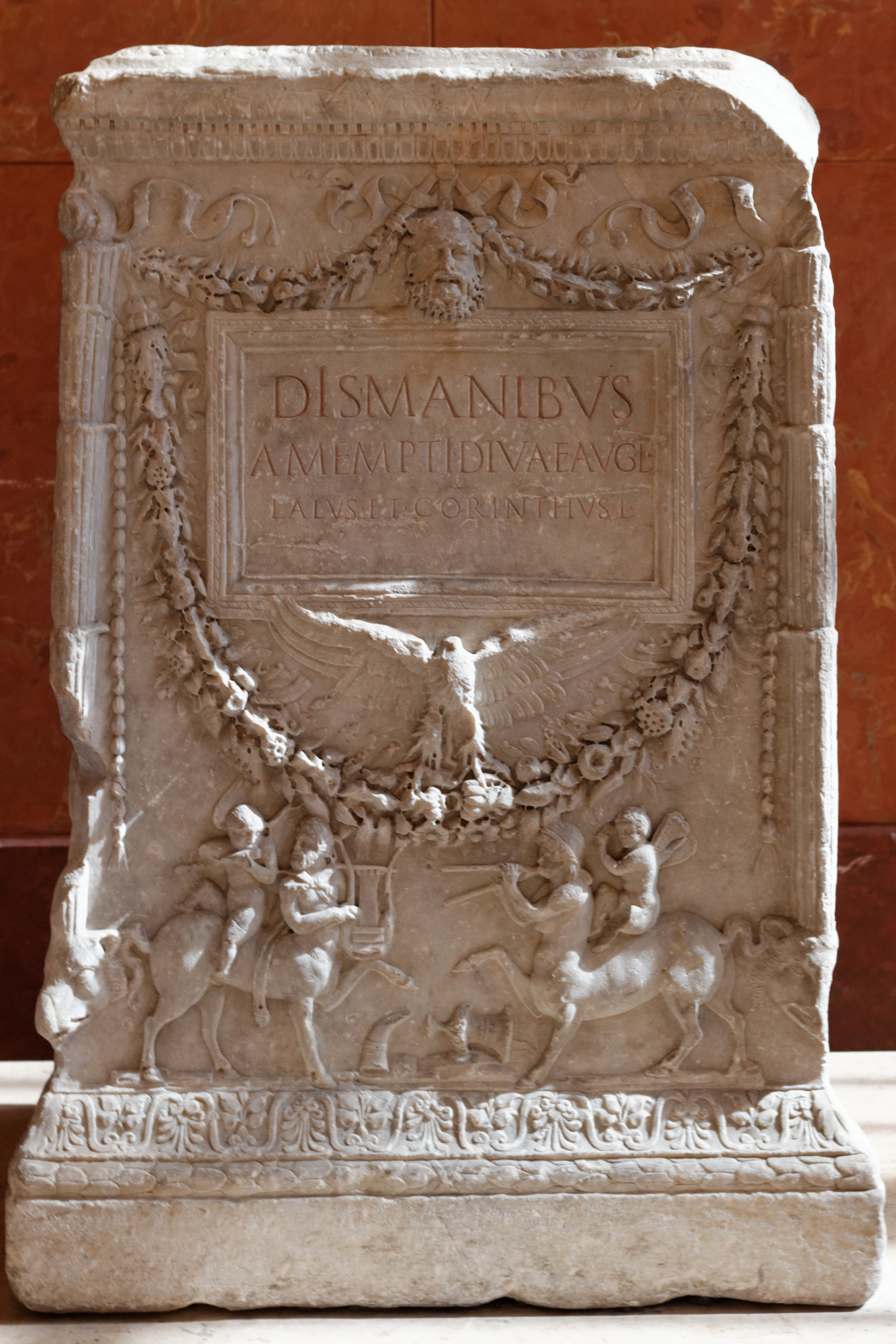
Altar with festoons; circa 50 AD; marble; height: 99.5 cm, width: 61.5 cm, depth: 47 cm; Louvre

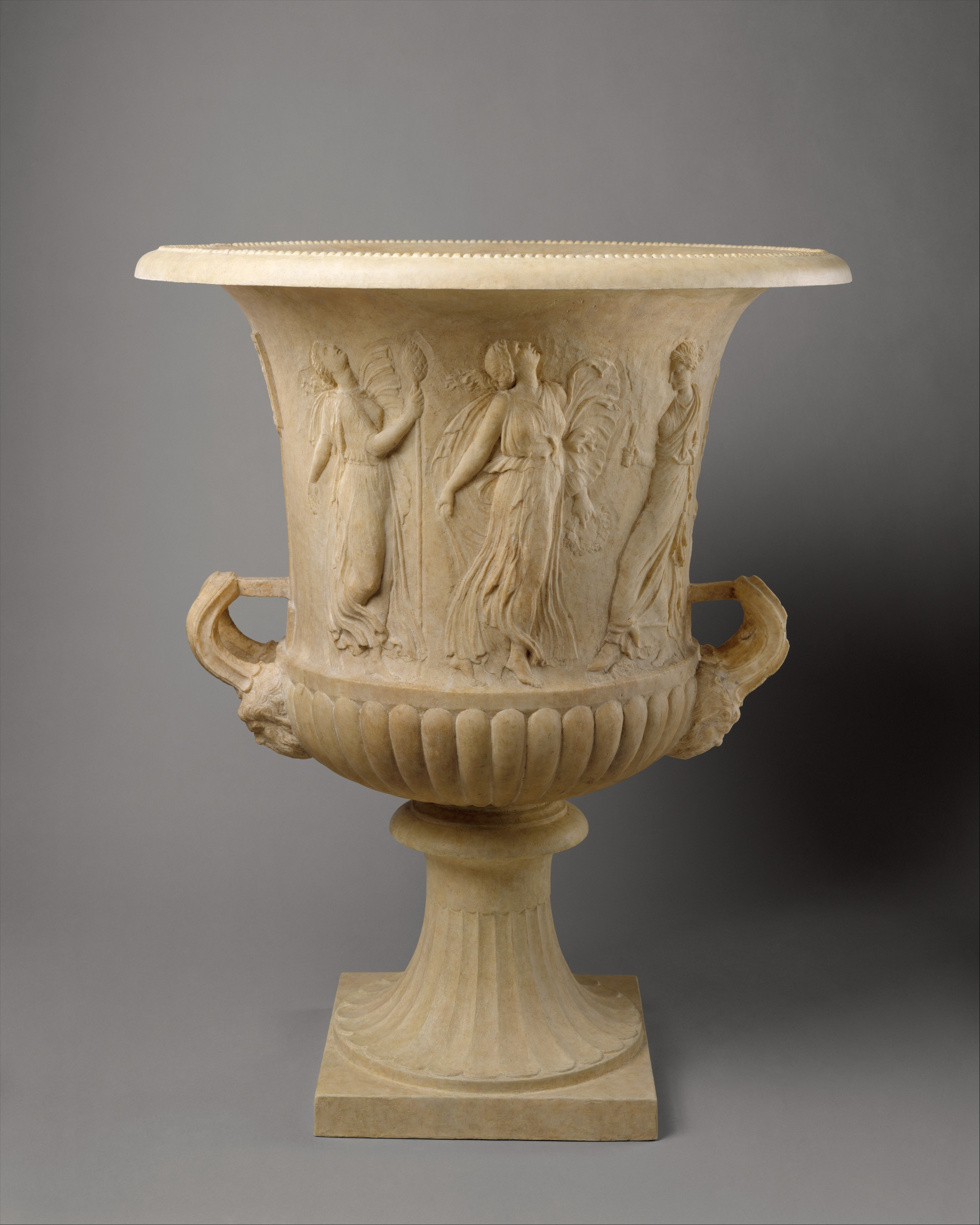
Calyx-krater with reliefs of maidens and dancing maenads; 1st century AD; Pentelic marble; height: 80.7 cm; Metropolitan Museum of Art

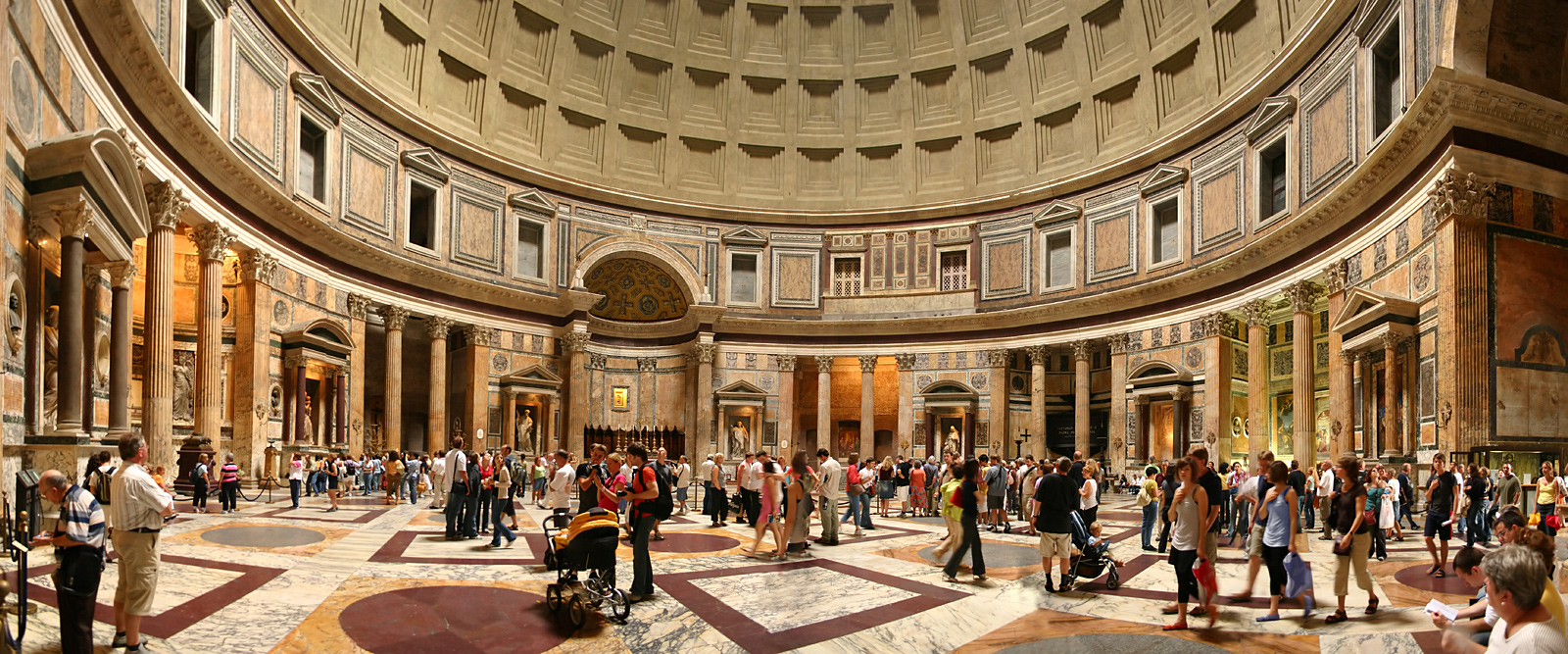
Panoramic view of the Pantheon (Rome), built between 113 and 125

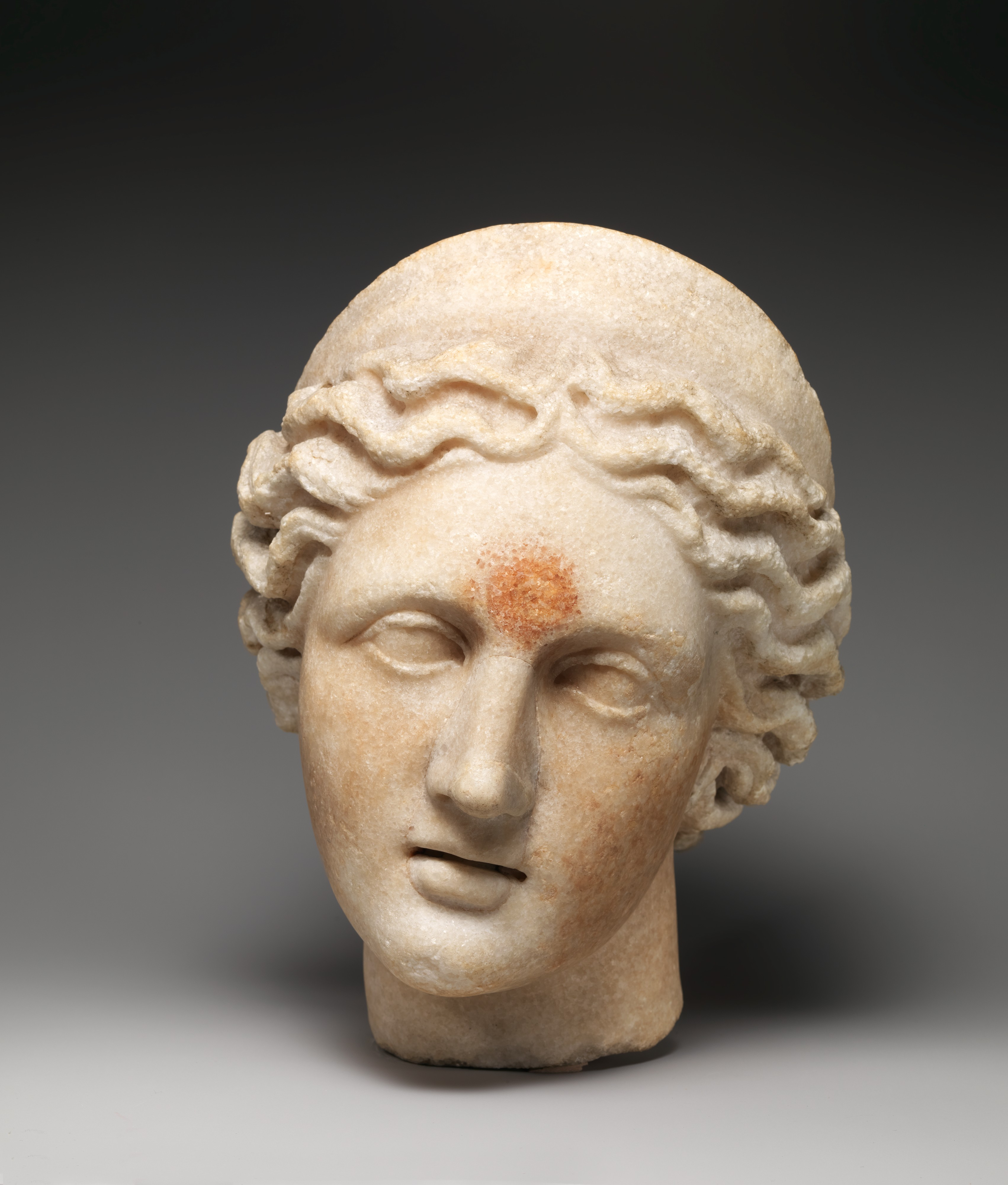
Head of a goddess wearing a diadem; 1st–2nd century; marble; height: 23 cm; Metropolitan Museum of Art

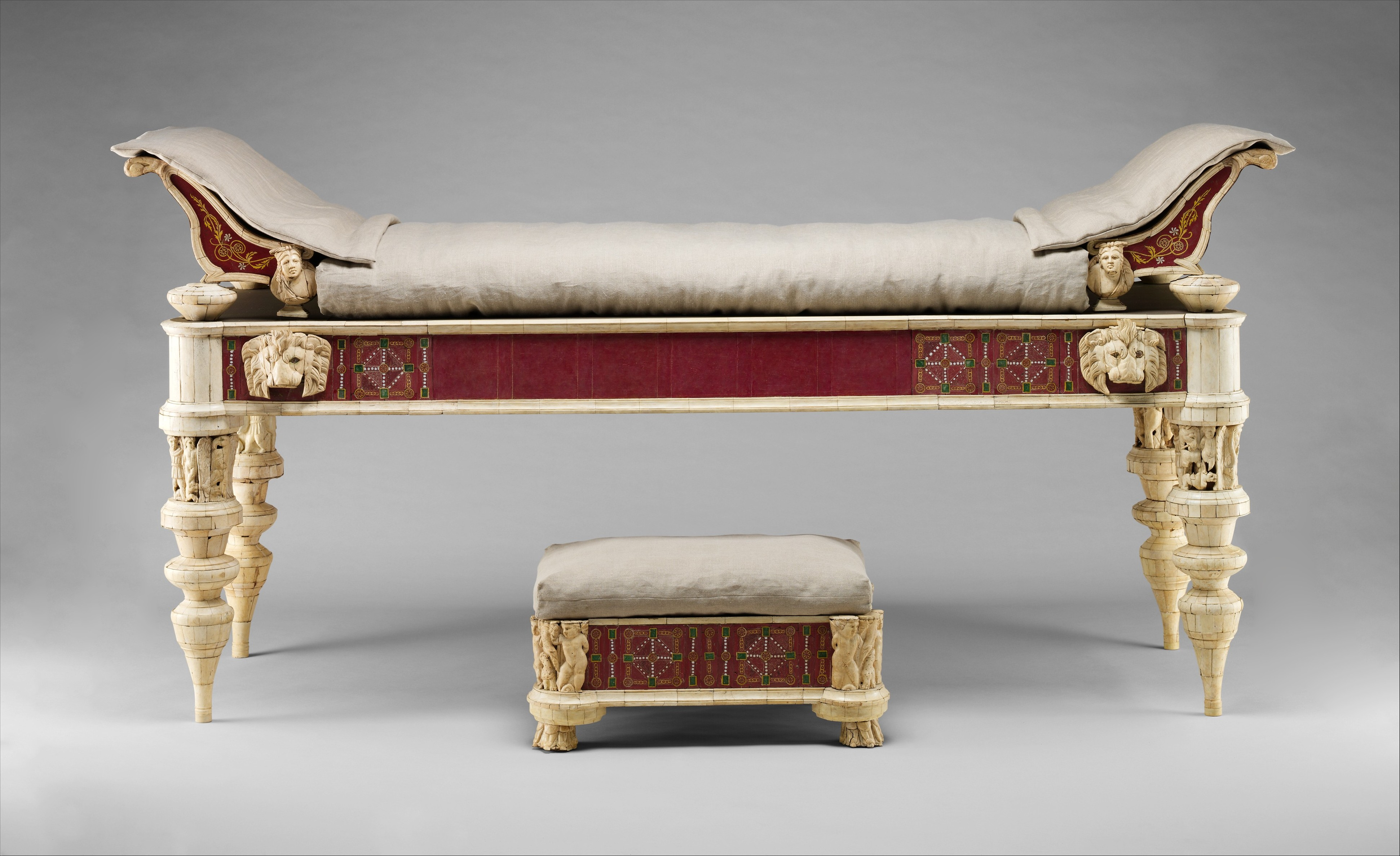
Couch and footstool; 1st–2nd century AD; wood, bone and glass; couch: 105.4 × 76.2 × 214.6 cm; Metropolitan Museum of Art

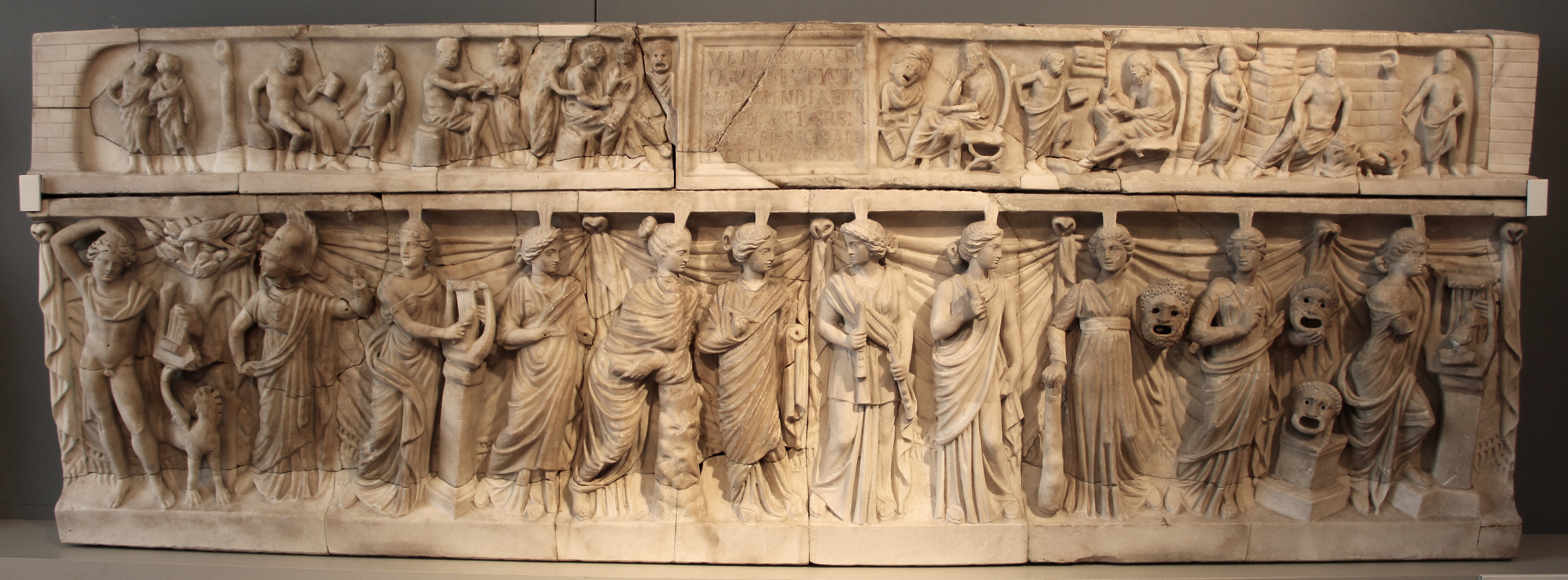
Sarcophagus with Apollo, Minerva and the Muses; circa 200 AD; from Via Appia; Antikensammlung Berlin (Berlin)

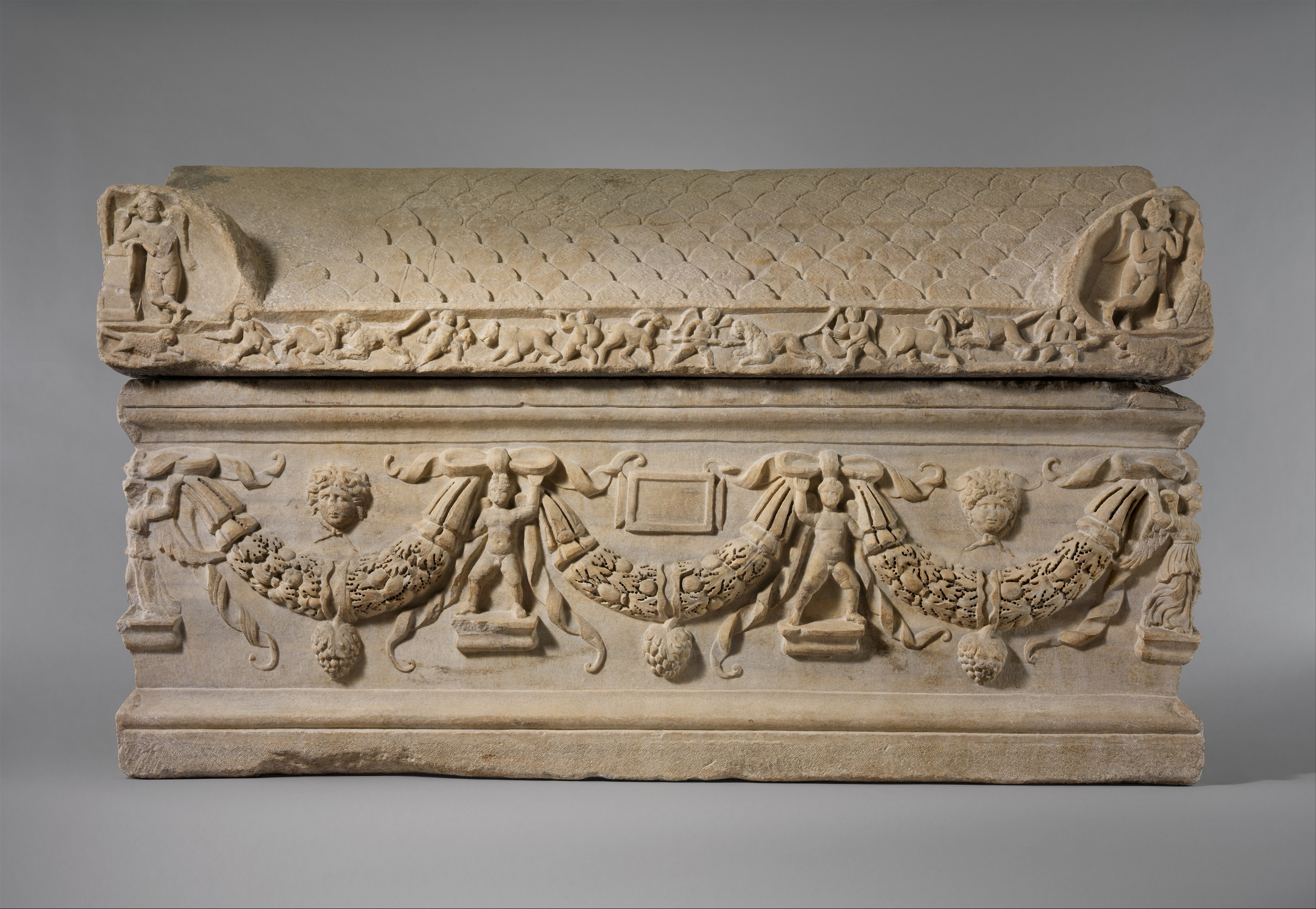
Sarcophagus with festoons; 200–225; marble; 134.6 x 223.5 cm; Metropolitan Museum of Art

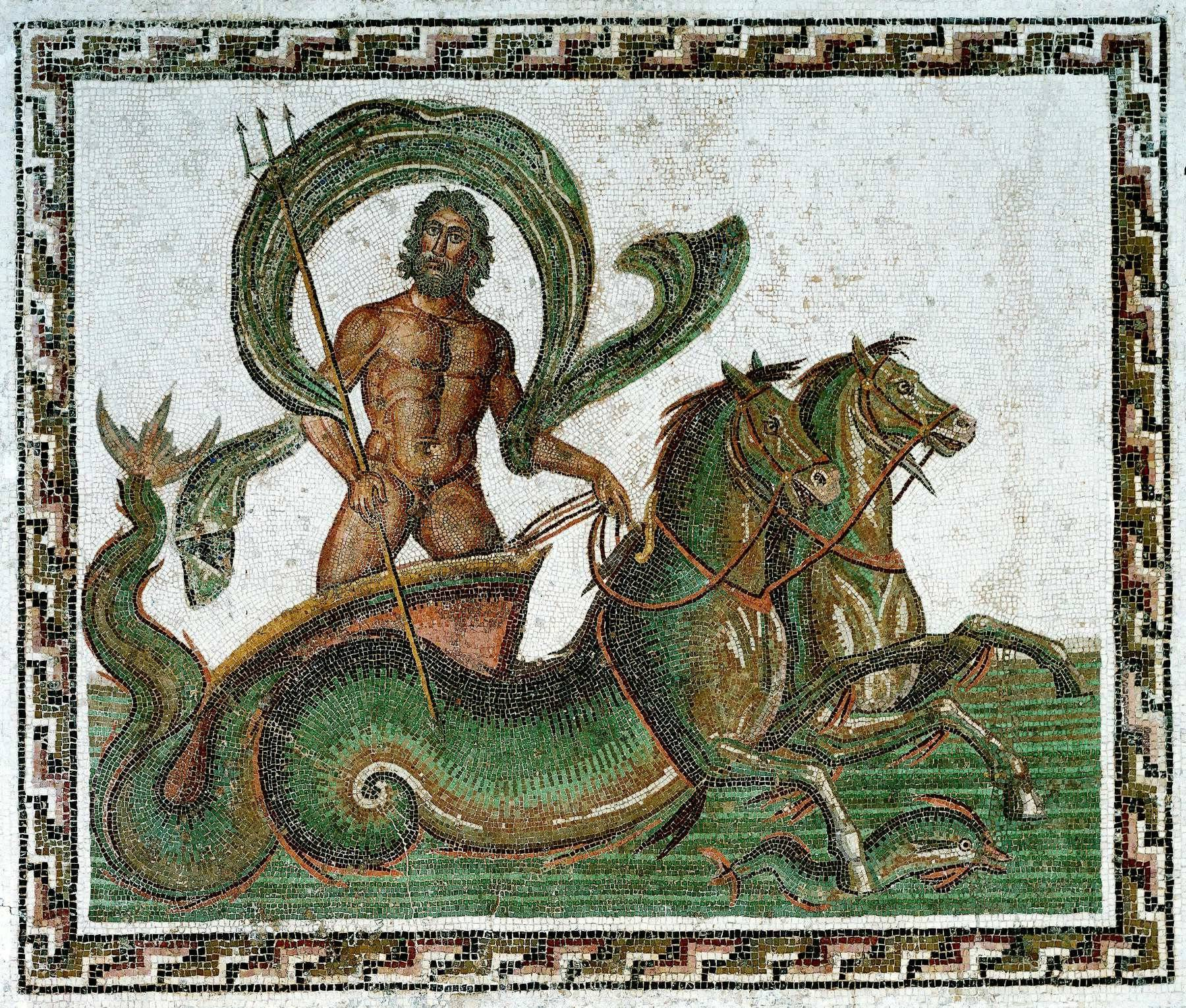
Triumph of Neptune standing on a chariot pulled by two sea horses; mid-3rd century; Sousse Archaeological Museum (Tunisia)

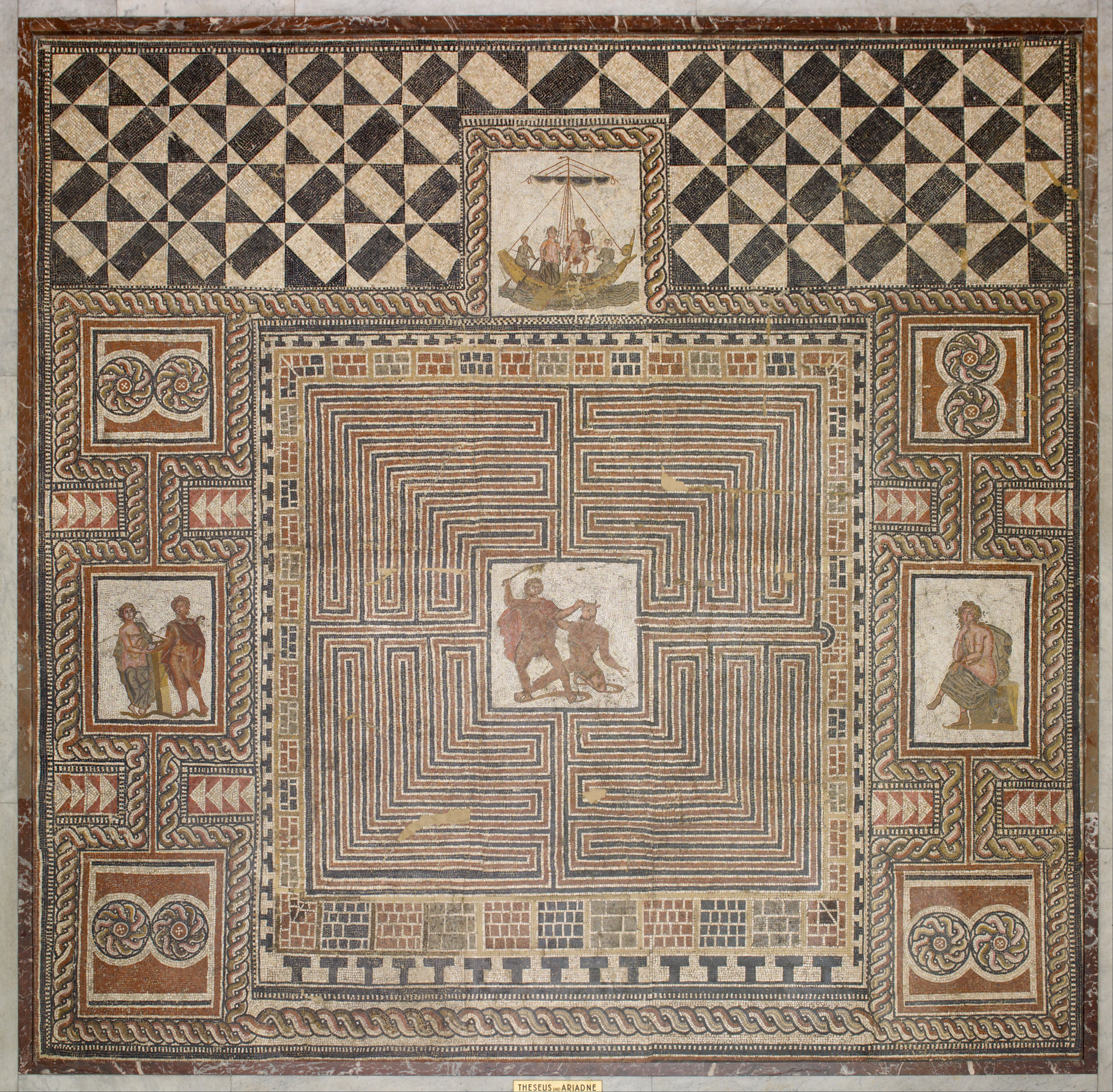
The Theseus Mosaic; 300-400 AD; marble and limestone pebbles; 4.1 x 4.2 m; Kunsthistorisches Museum (Vienna, Austria)

== Central and South Asia ==
=== Bactrian ===
The Bactria–Margiana Archaeological Complex is the modern archaeological designation for a Bronze Age civilization of Central Asia, dated to c. 2300–1700 BC, in present-day northern Afghanistan, eastern Turkmenistan, southern Uzbekistan, and western Tajikistan, centred on the upper Amu Darya (Oxus River). Its sites were discovered and named by the Soviet archaeologist Viktor Sarianidi (1976). Monumental urban centres, palaces, and cultic buildings were uncovered, notably at Gonur-depe in Turkmenistan.

BMAC materials have been found in the Indus Valley civilisation, on the Iranian Plateau, and in the Persian Gulf. Finds within BMAC sites provide further evidence of trade and cultural contacts. They include an Elamite-type cylinder seal and a Harappan seal stamped with an elephant and Indus script found at Gonur-depe. The relationship between Altyn-Depe and the Indus Valley seems to have been particularly strong. Among the finds, there were two Harappan seals and ivory objects. The Harappan settlement of Shortugai in Northern Afghanistan on the banks of the Amu Darya probably served as a trading station.

A famous type of Bactrian artwork is the "Bactrian princesses" (a.k.a. "Oxus ladies"). Wearing large stylized dresses with puffed sleeves, as well as headdresses that merge with the hair, they embody the ranking goddess, a character of the central Asian mythology that plays a regulatory role, pacifying the untamed forces. These statuettes are made by combining and assembling materials of contrasting colours. The preferred materials are chlorite (or similar dark green stones), a whitish limestone or mottled alabaster, or marine shells from the Indian Ocean. The different elements of body and costume were carved separately and joined, as in a puzzle, by tenon and mortices glue.

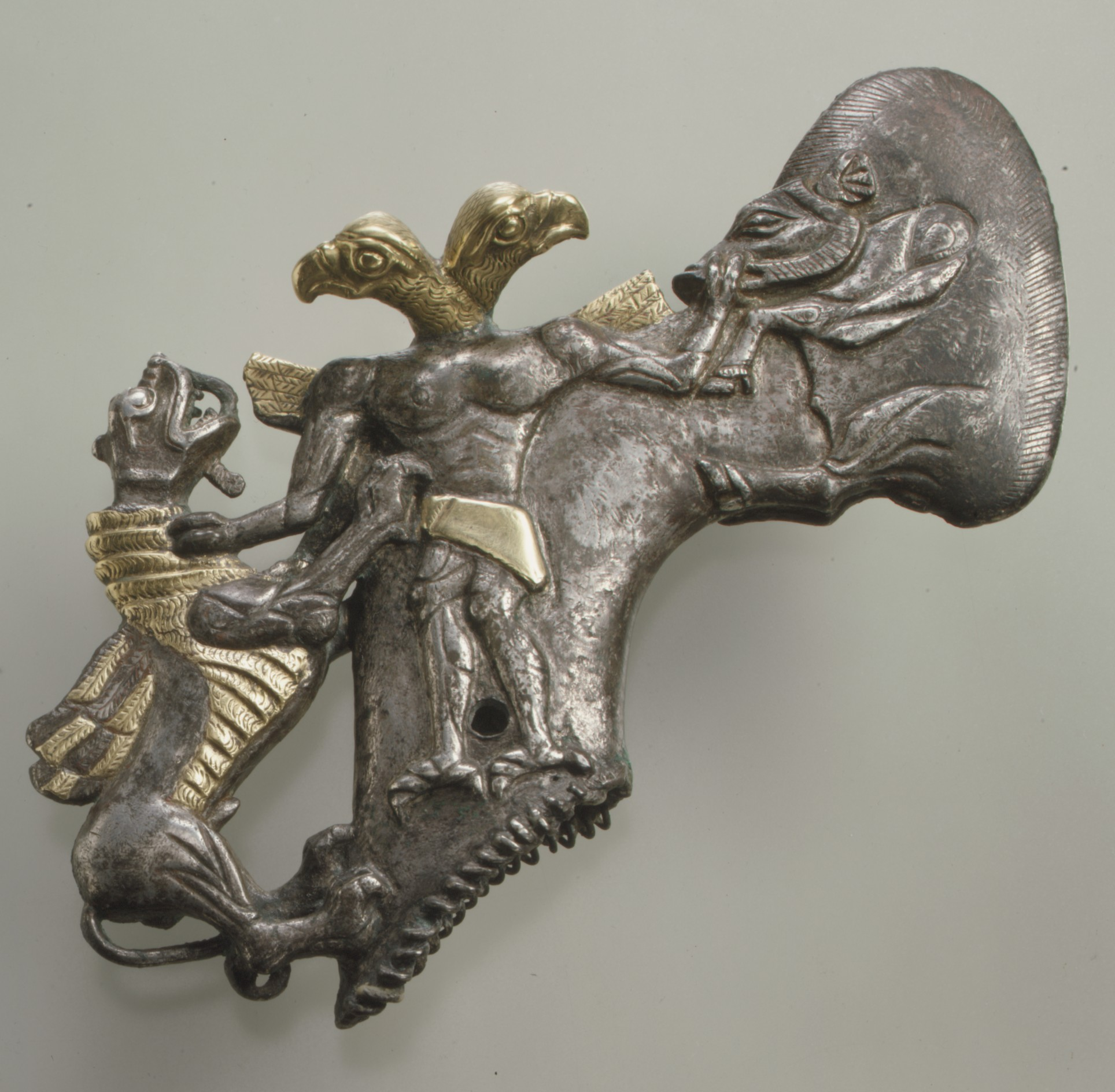
Axe with eagle-headed demon & animals; late 3rd millennium-early 2nd millennium BC; gilt silver; length: 15 cm; Metropolitan Museum of Art (New York City)

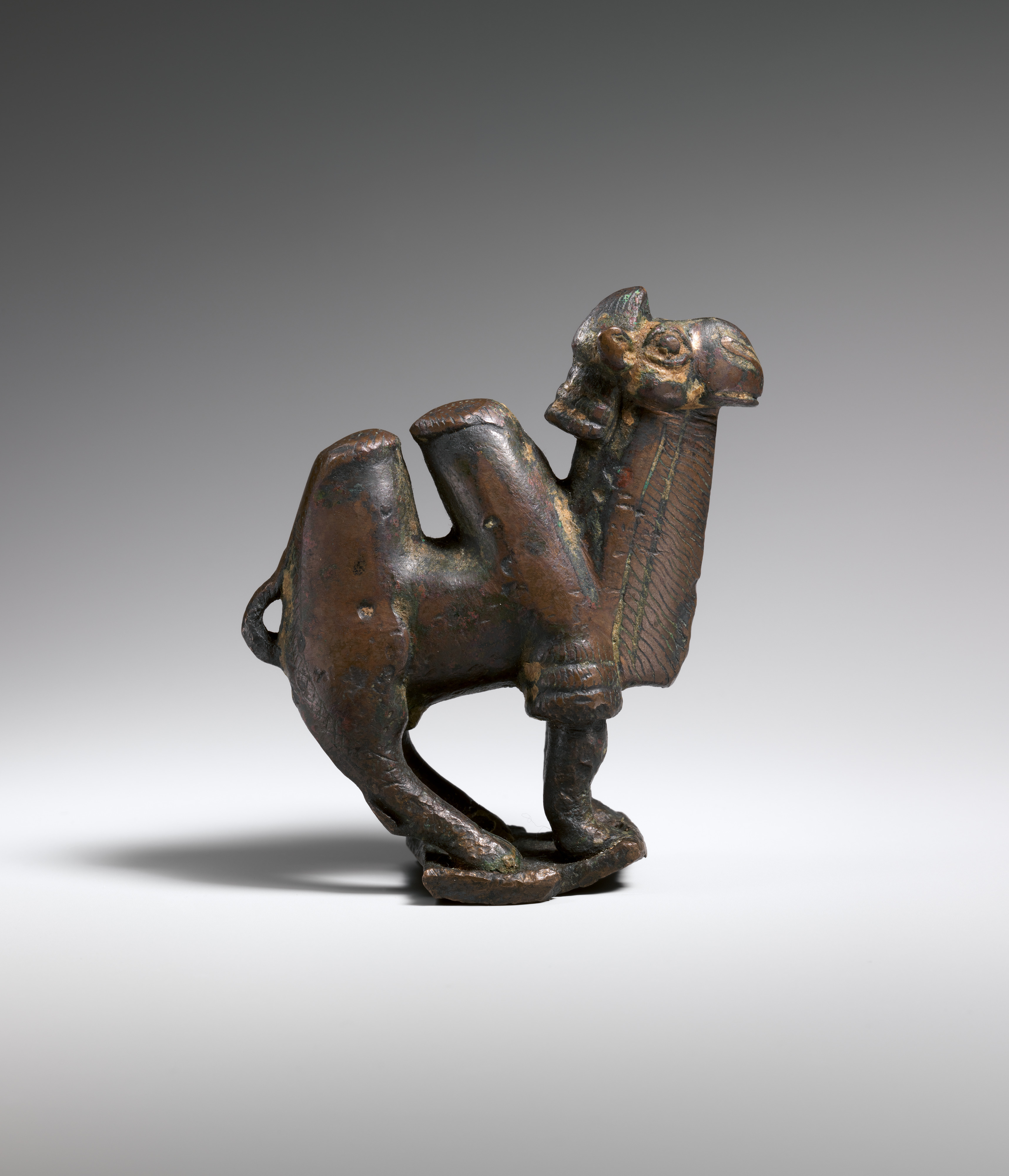
Camel figurine; late 3rd–early 2nd millennium BC; copper alloy; 8.89 cm; Metropolitan Museum of Art

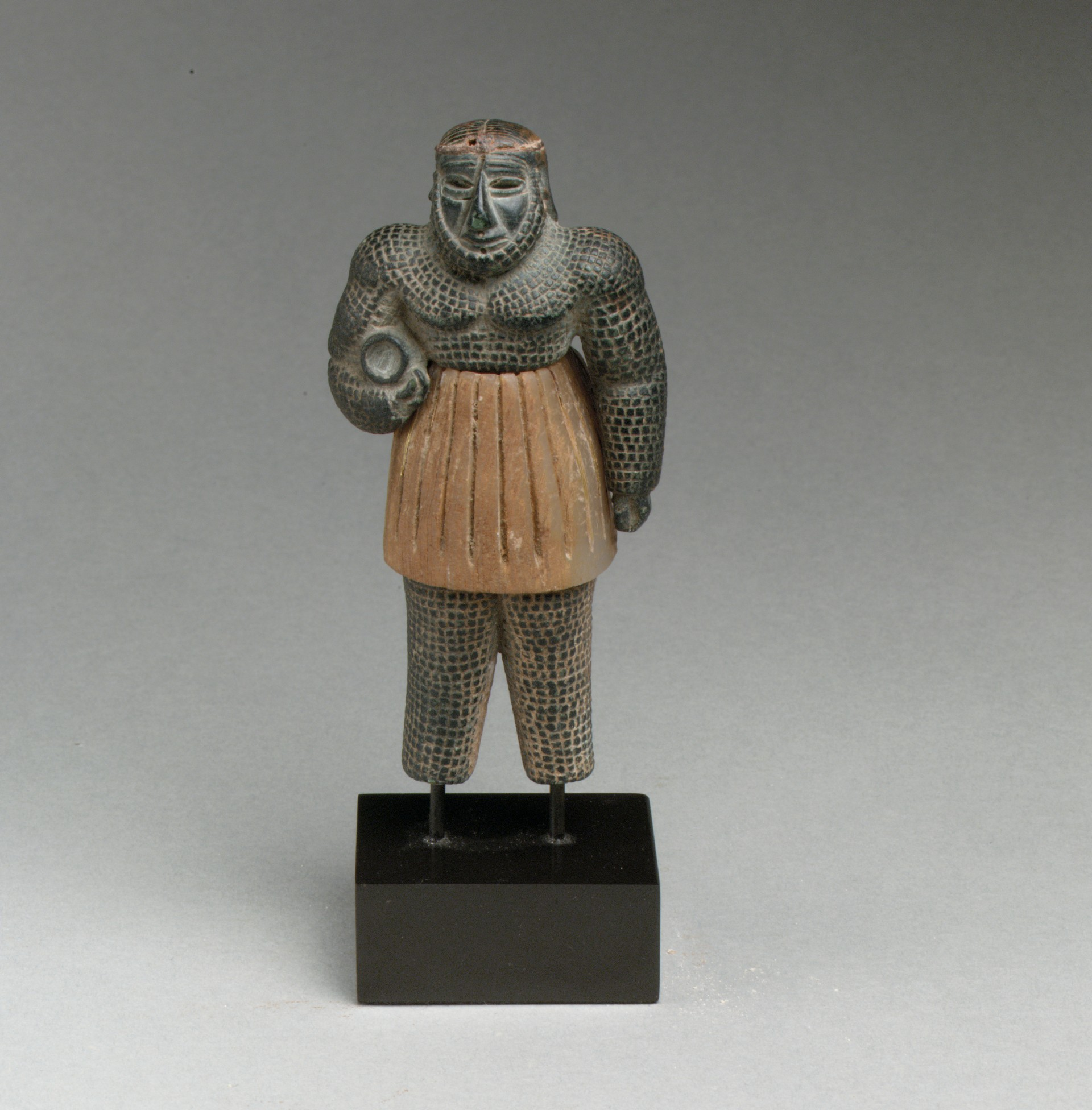
Monstrous male figure; late 3rd–early 2nd millennium BC; chlorite, calcite, gold, and iron; height: 10.1 cm; Metropolitan Museum of Art

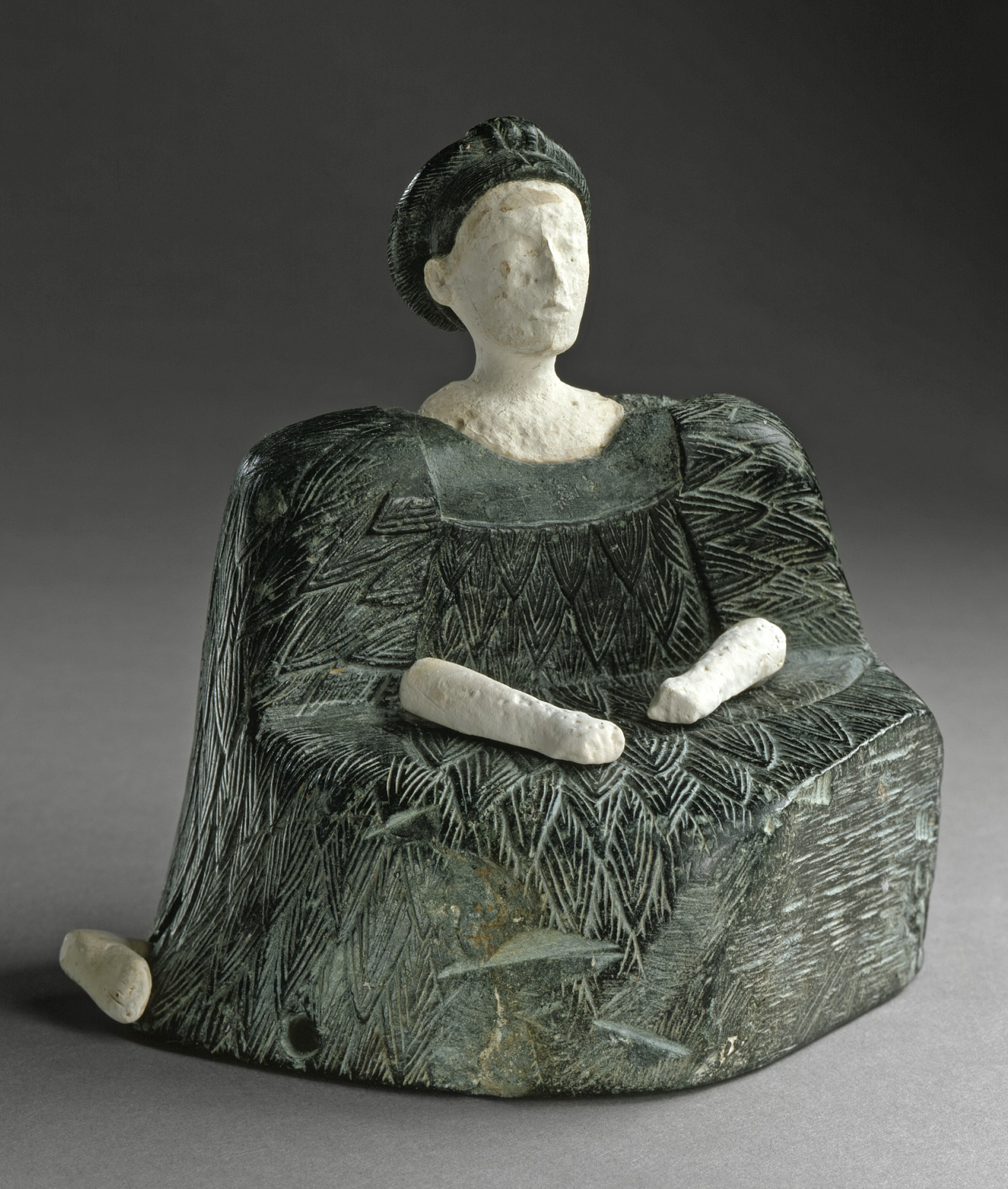
Female figurine of the "Bactrian princess" type; 2500–1500; chlorite (dress and headdress) and limestone (head, hands and a leg); height: 13.33 cm; Los Angeles County Museum of Art (US)

=== Indian ===
The first sculptures in India date back to the Indus Valley civilization some 5,000 years ago when small stone carvings and bronze castings have been discovered. Later, as Hinduism, Buddhism and Jainism developed further, India produced some of the most intricate bronzes in the world, as well as unrivaled temple carvings, some in huge shrines, such as the one at Ellora.

The Ajanta Caves in Maharashtra, India are rock-cut cave monuments dating back to the second century BC and containing paintings and sculpture considered to be masterpieces of both Buddhist religious art and universal pictorial art.

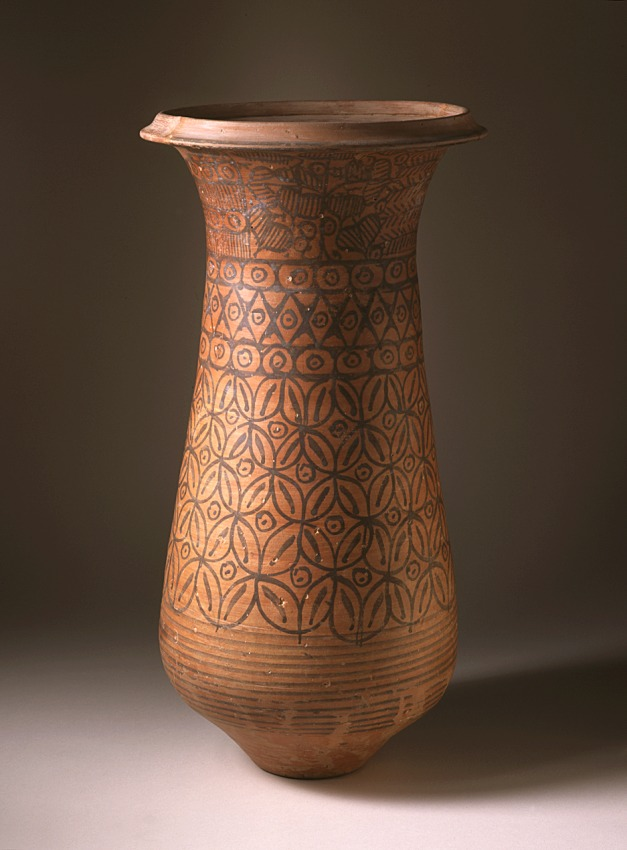
Ceremonial vessel; 2600-2450 BC; terracotta with black paint; 49.53 × 25.4 cm; Los Angeles County Museum of Art (US)

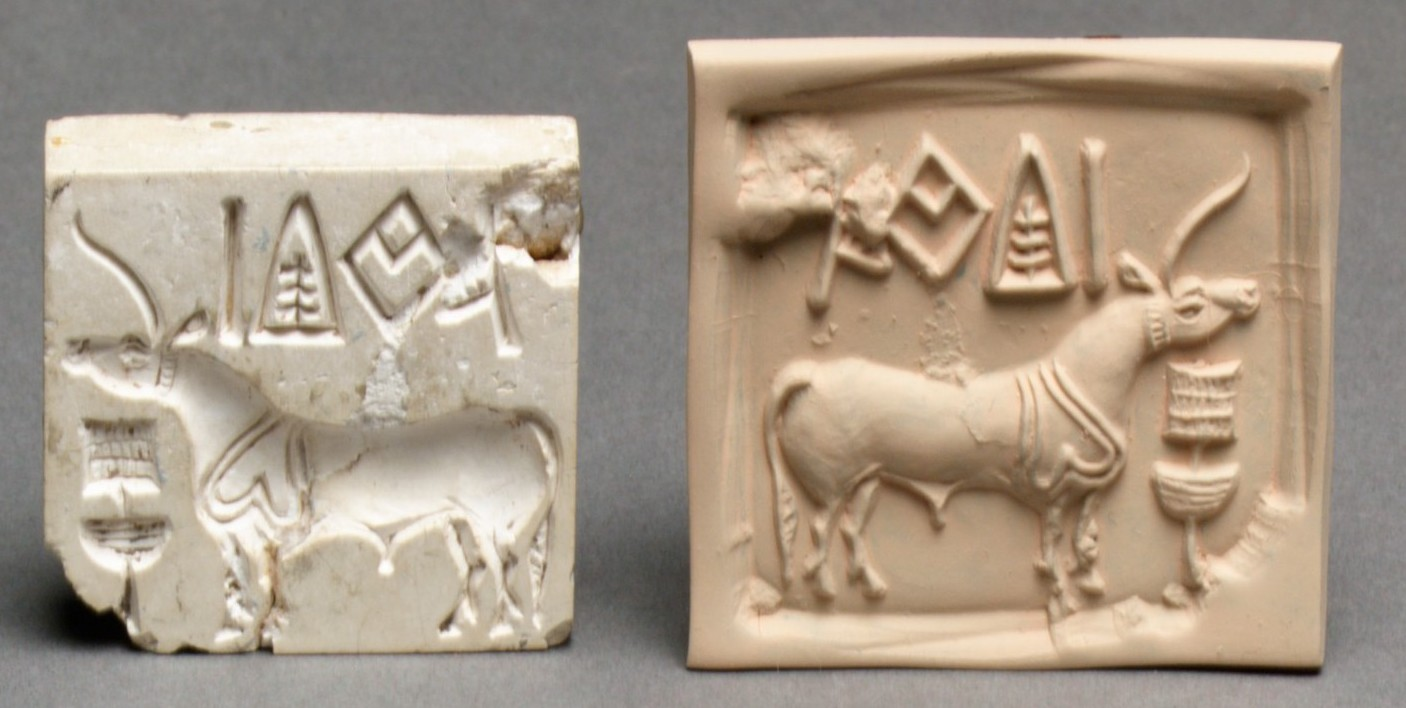
Stamp seal and modern impression: unicorn and incense burner (?); 2600-1900 BC; burnt steatite; 3.8 × 3.8 × 1 cm; Metropolitan Museum of Art (New York City)

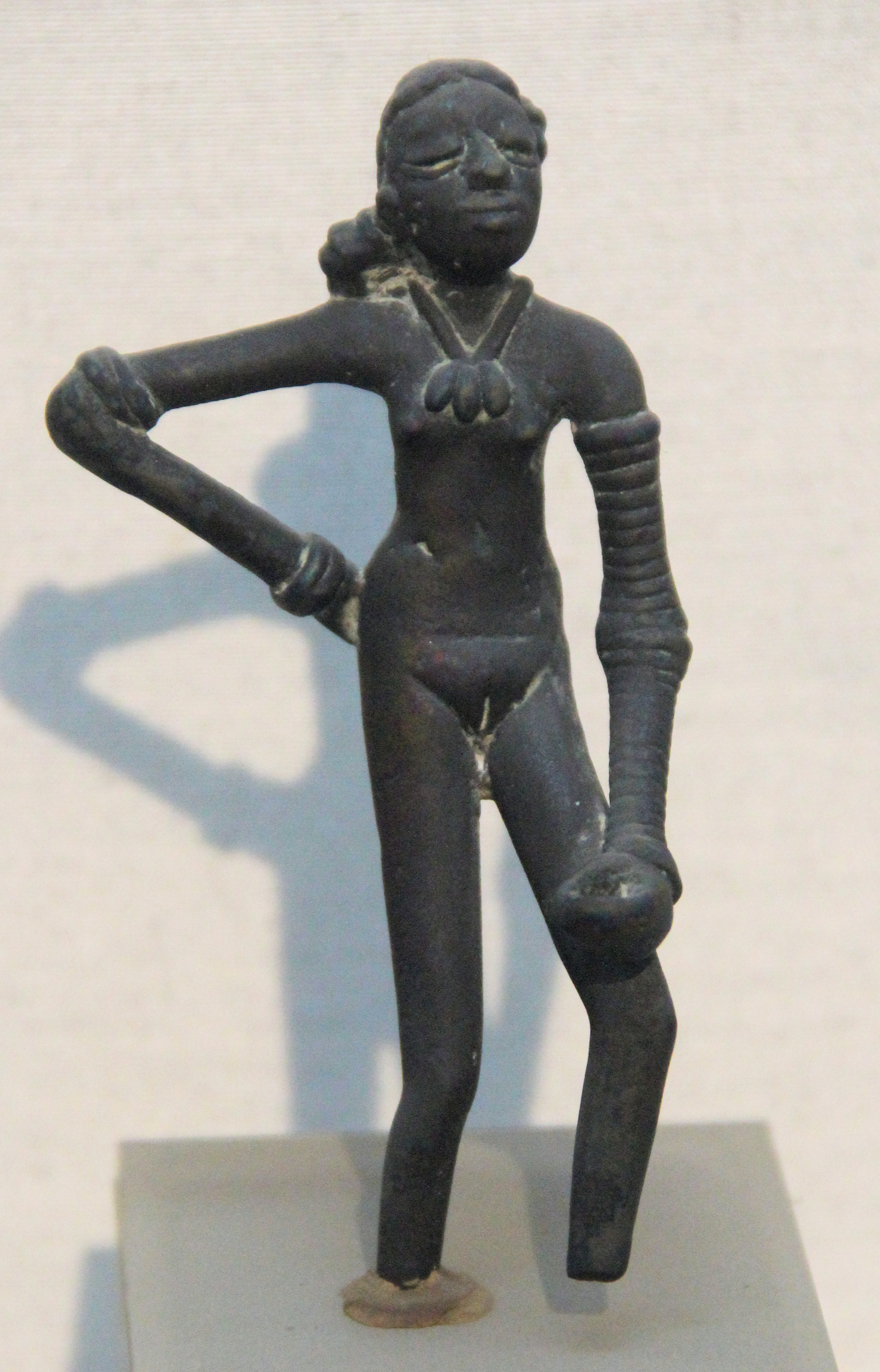
The Dancing Girl; 2400–1900 BC; bronze; height: 10.8 cm; National Museum (New Delhi, India)

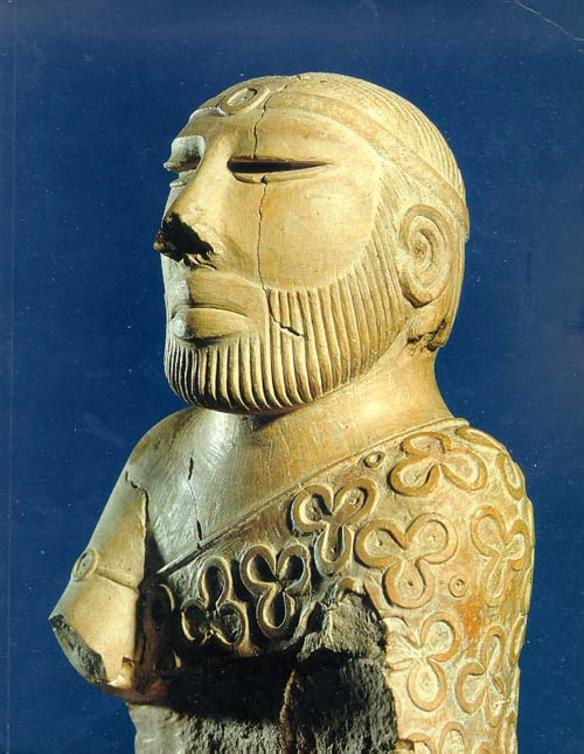
The Priest-King; 2400–1900 BC; low fired steatite; height: 17.5 cm; National Museum of Pakistan (Karachi)

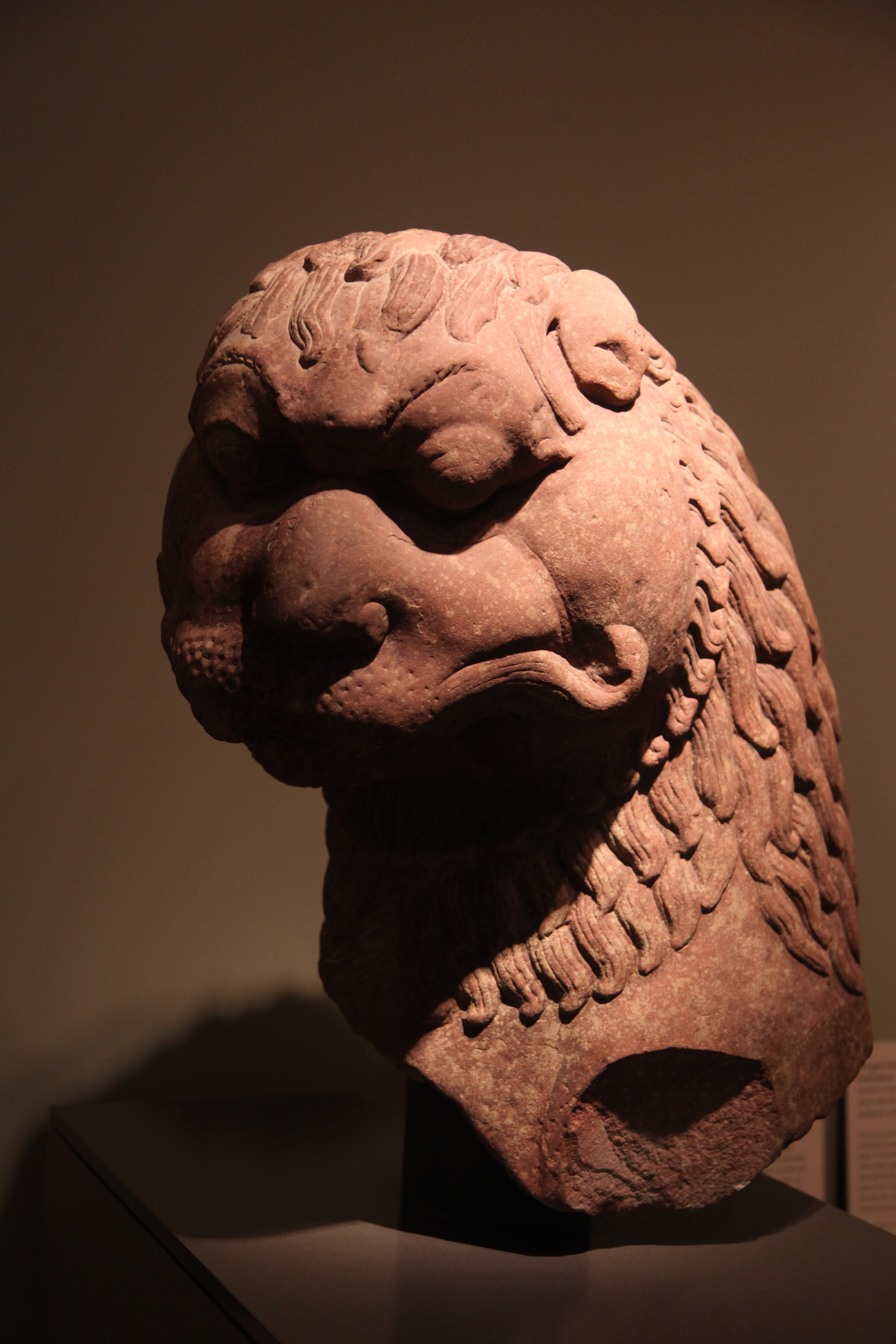
Head and chest of a lion; circa 5th century; sandstone; height: 61 cm, width: 35.6 cm; Museum of Fine Arts (Boston, US)

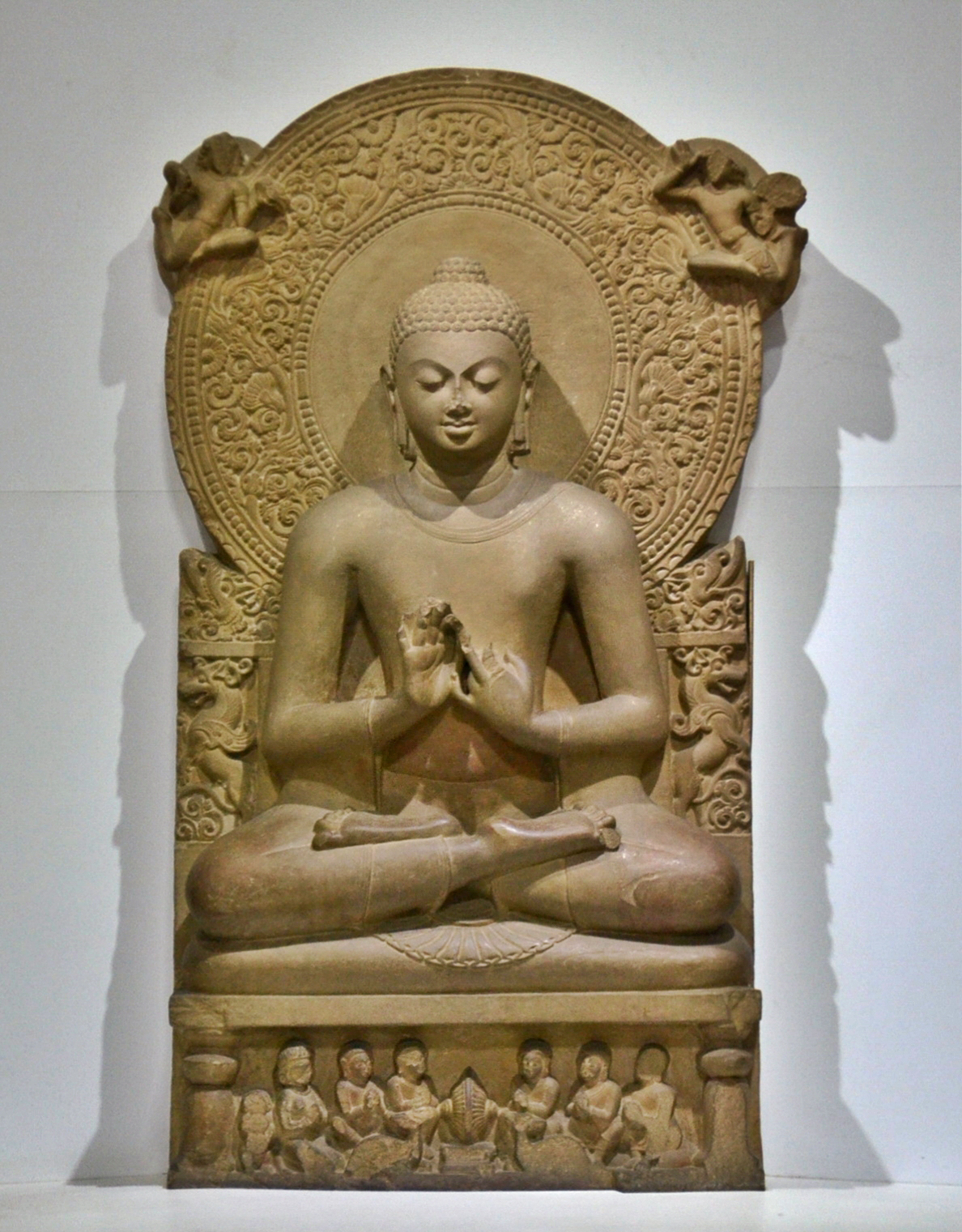
Seated Buddha; circa 475; sandstone; height: 1.6 m; Sarnath Museum (India)

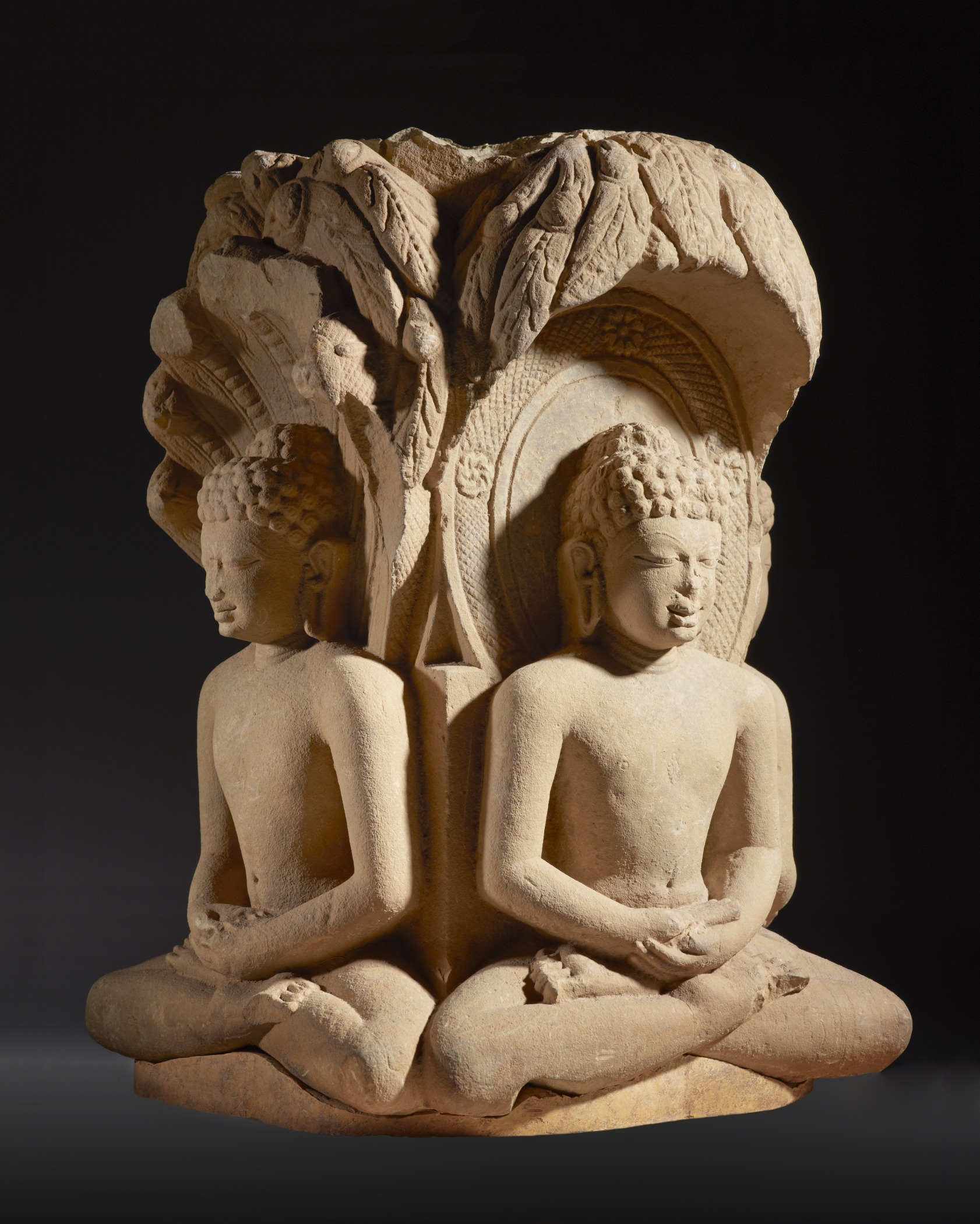
Chaumukha idol; circa 600; sandstone; 58.42 x 43.18 x 44.45 cm; Los Angeles County Museum of Art

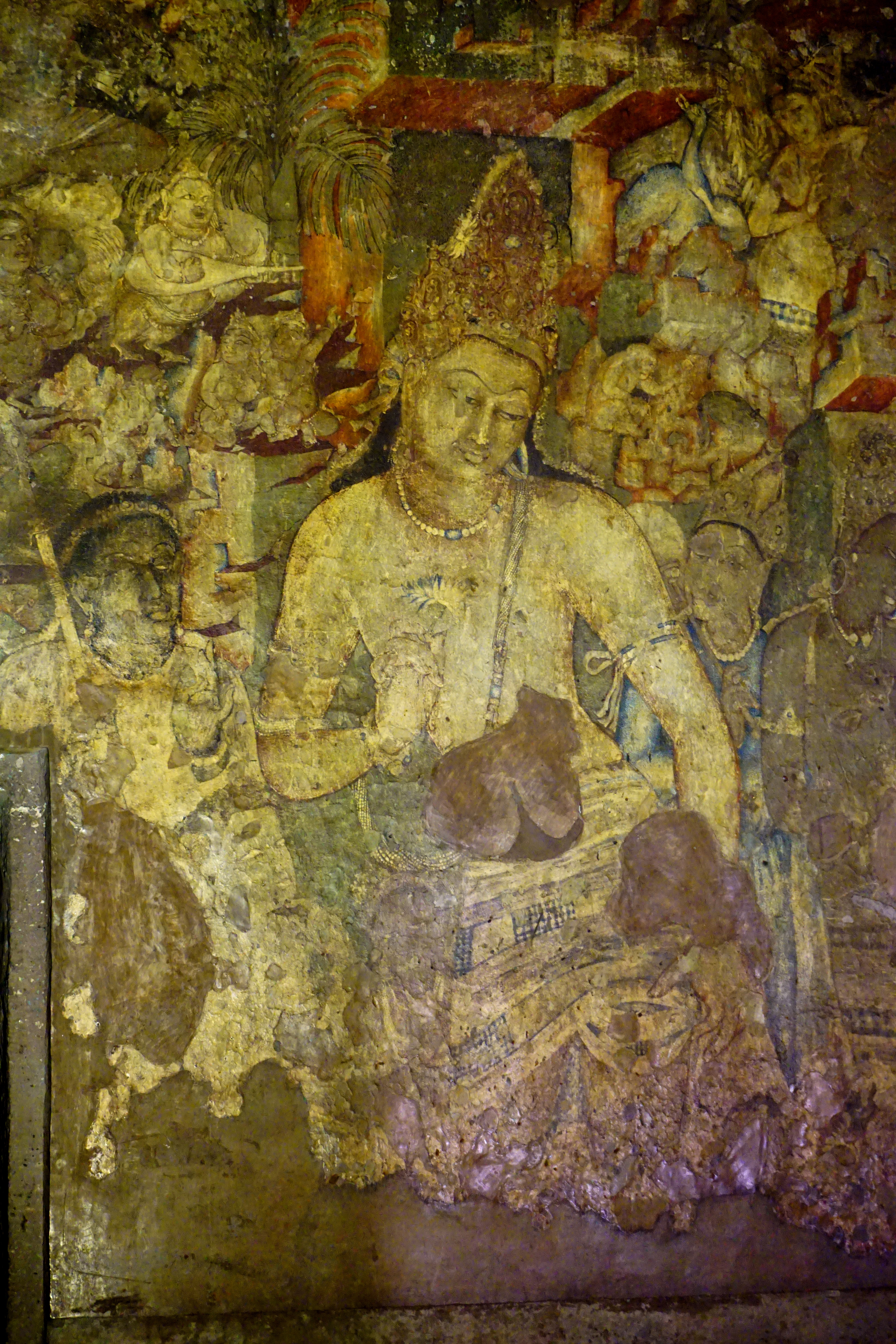
Bodhisattva Padmapani; 450–490; pigments on rock; height: circa 1.2 m; Ajanta Caves (India)

== East Asia ==
=== Chinese ===
Prehistoric artwork such as painted pottery in Neolithic China can be traced back to the Yangshao culture and Longshan culture of the Yellow River valley. During China's Bronze Age, Chinese of the ancient Shang dynasty and Zhou dynasty produced multitudes of artistic bronzeware vessels for practical purposes, but also for religious ritual and geomancy. The earliest (surviving) Chinese paintings date to the Warring States period, and they were on silk as well as lacquerwares.

One of ancient China's most famous artistic relics remains the Terracotta warriors, an assembly of 8,099 individual and life-size terracotta figures (such as infantry, horses with chariots and cavalry, archers, and military officers), buried in the tomb of Qin Shi Huang, the First Qin Emperor, in 210 BC. This tradition was carried into the subsequent Han dynasty, although their tombs contained miniature versions of the soldiers in addition to domestic servants to serve rulers and nobility in the afterlife. Chinese art arguably shows more continuity between ancient and modern periods than that of any other civilization, as even when foreign dynasties took the Imperial throne they did not impose new cultural or religious habits and were relatively quickly assimilated.

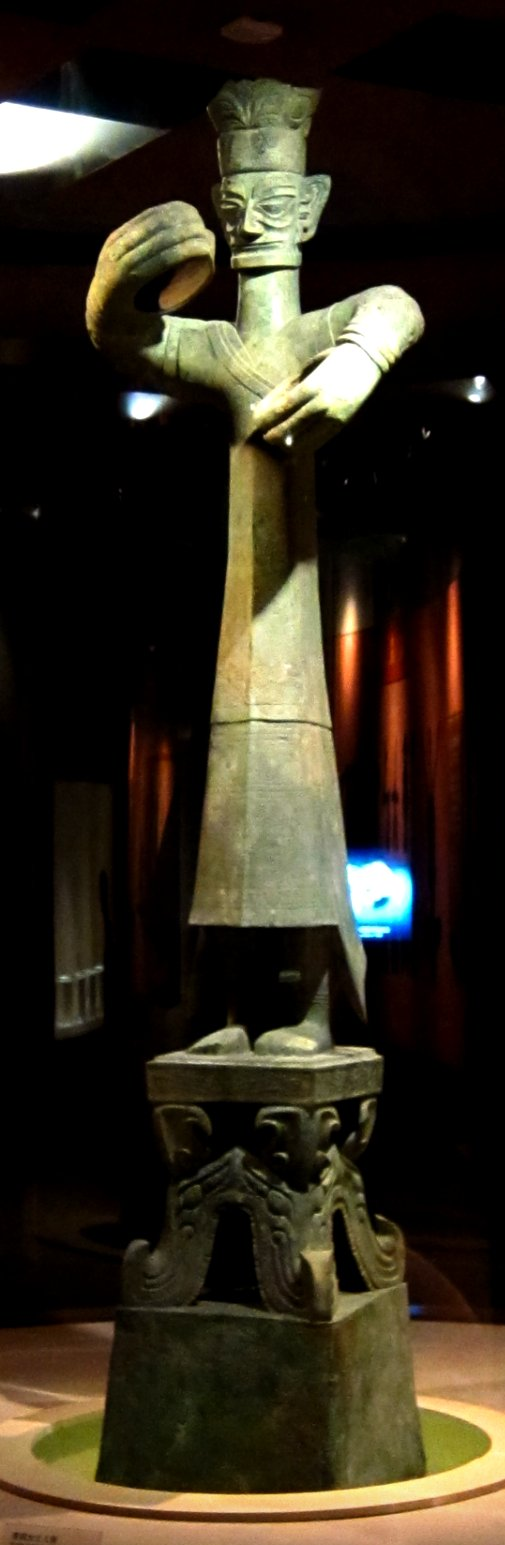
Standing statue of a king and shaman leader; c. 1200–1000 BC; probably bronze; total height: 2.62 m; Sanxingdui Museum (Guanghan, Sichuan province, China)

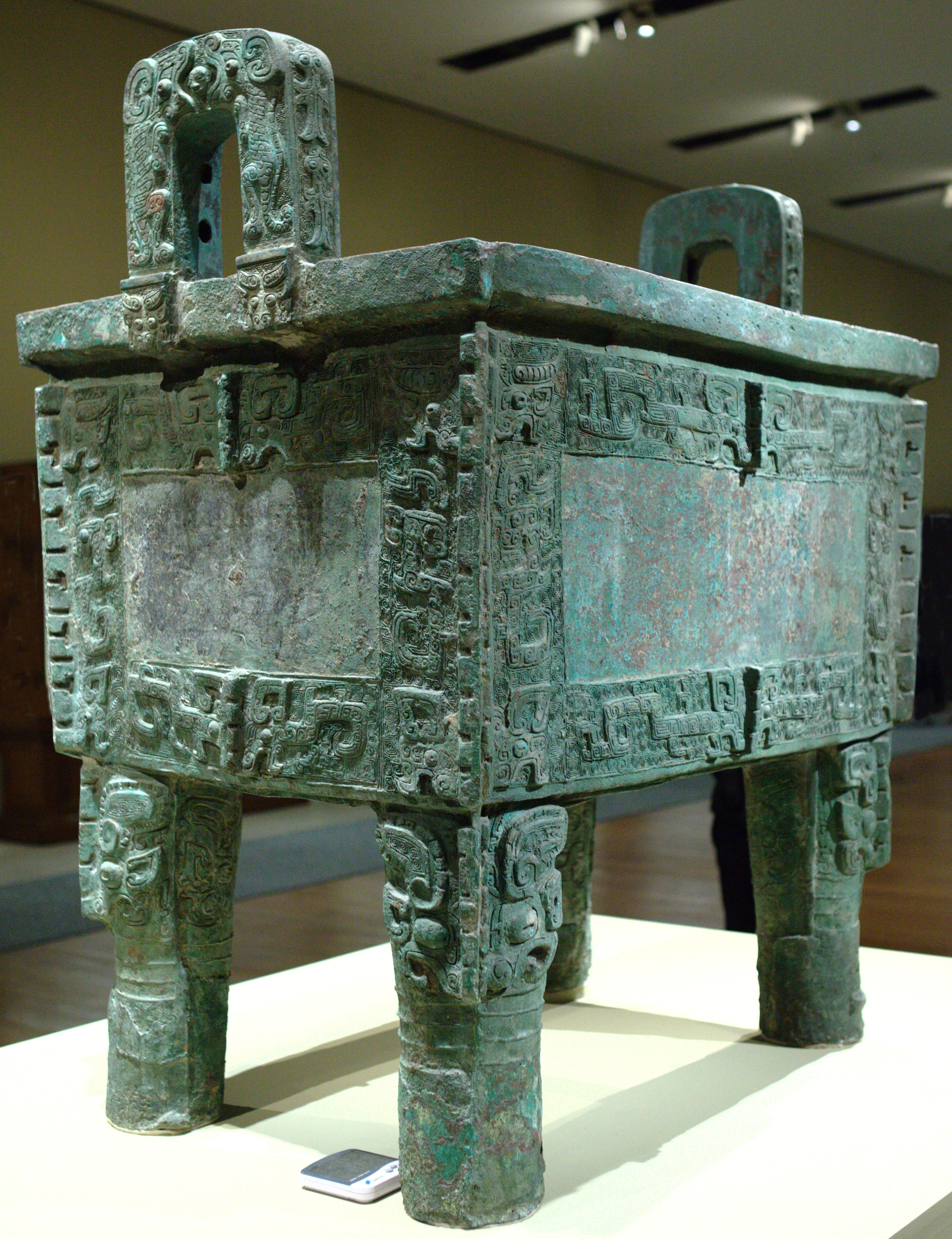
Houmuwu ding, the largest ancient bronze ever found; 1300–1046 BC; bronze; National Museum of China (Beijing)

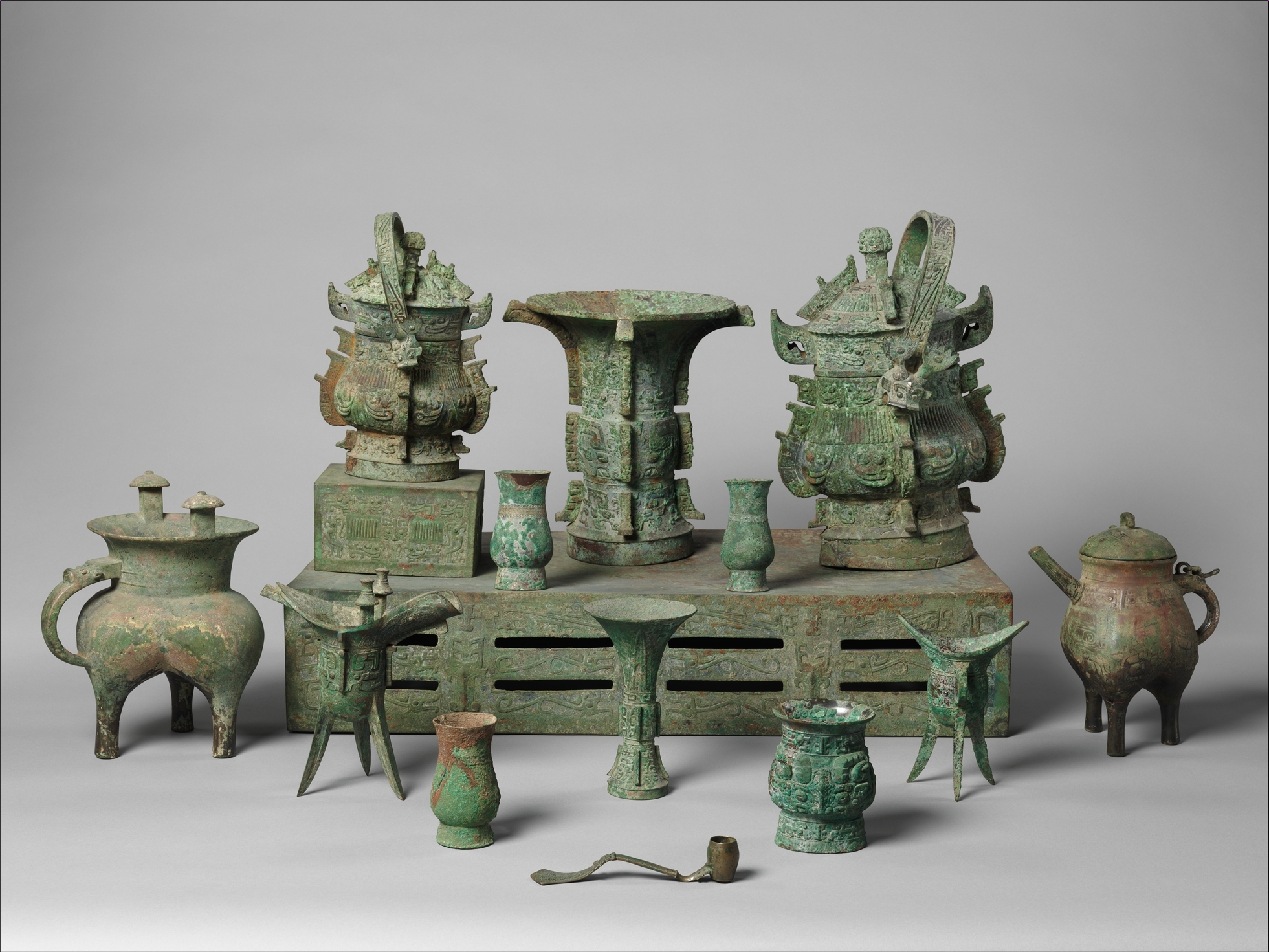
Altar set; late 11th century BC; bronze; overall (table): height: 18.1 cm, width: 46.4 cm, depth: 89.9 cm; Metropolitan Museum of Art (New York City)

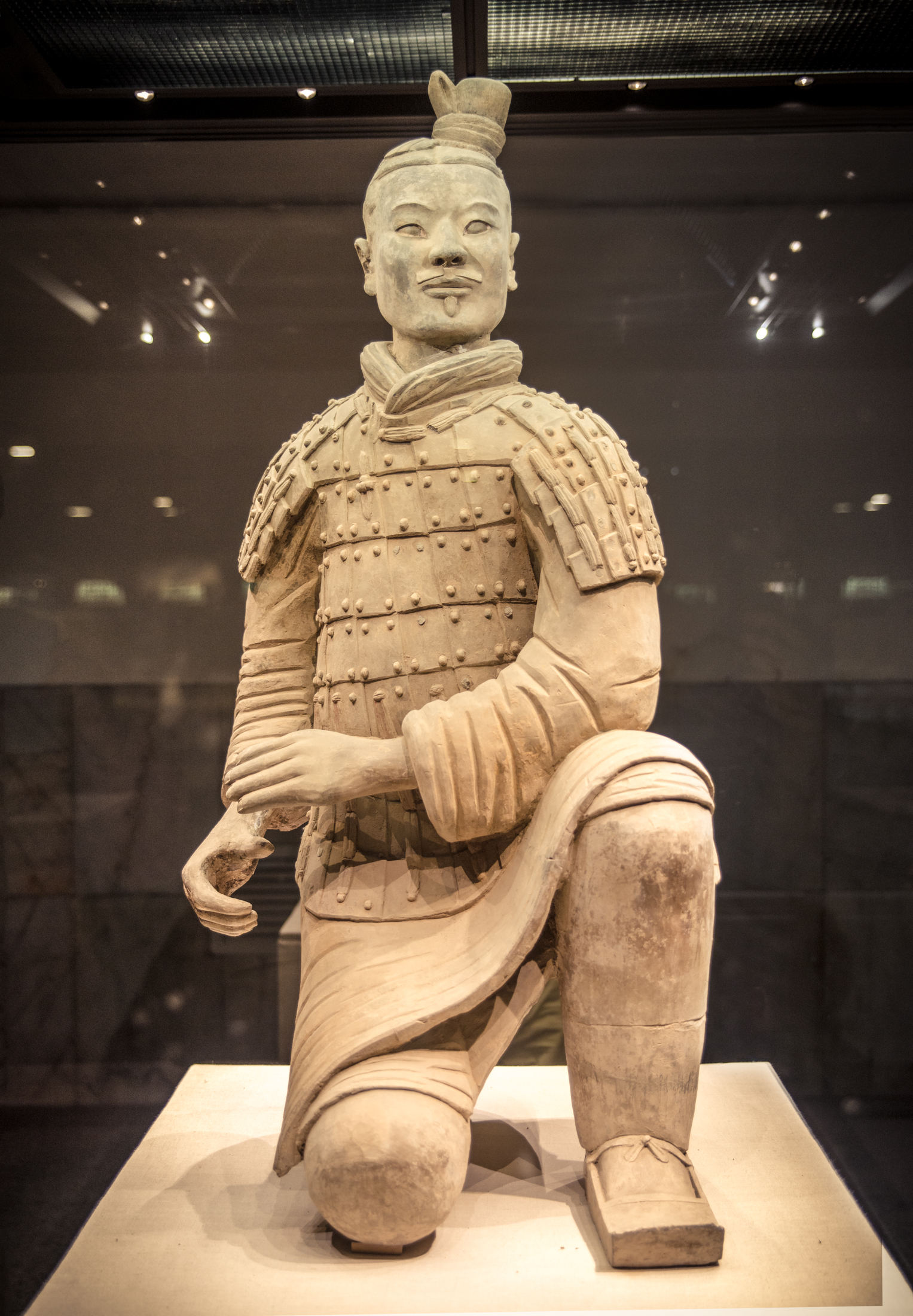
One of the warriors of the Terracotta Army, a famous collection of terracotta sculptures depicting the armies of Qin Shi Huang, the first Emperor of China

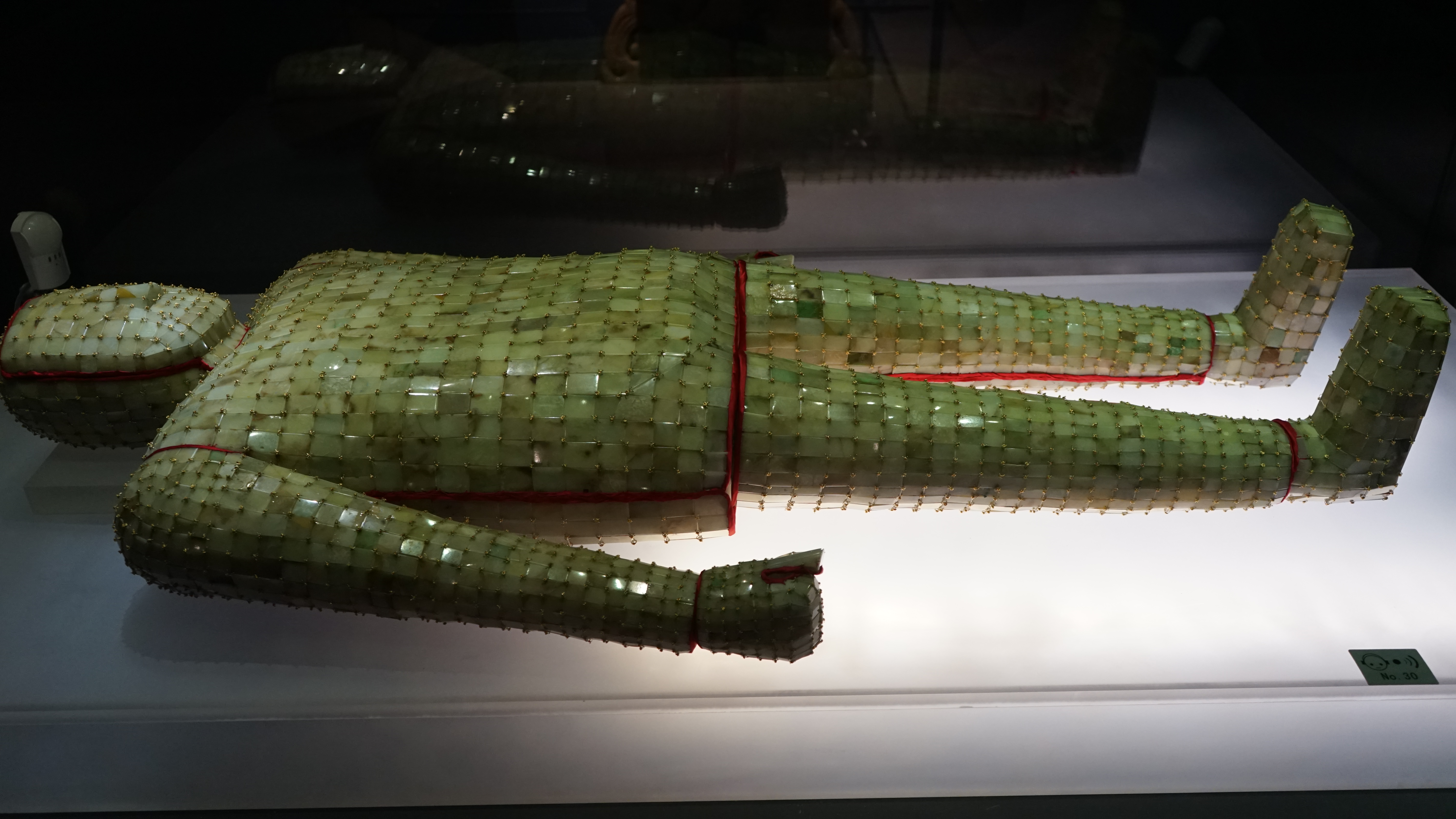
Golden Jade-clothes. It is now in the Hebei Museum. It is the highest standard funeral costume in the Han dynasty

=== Japanese ===
The eras of Japanese art correspond to the locations of various governments. The earliest known Japanese artifacts are attributable to the Aniu tribe, who influenced the Jōmon people, and these eras came to be known as the Jōmon and Yayoi time periods. Before the Yayoi invaded Japan, Jimmu in 660 B.C. was the crowned emperor. Later came the Haniwa of the Kofun era, then the Asuka when Buddhism reached Japan from China. Religion influenced Japanese art significantly for centuries thereafter.

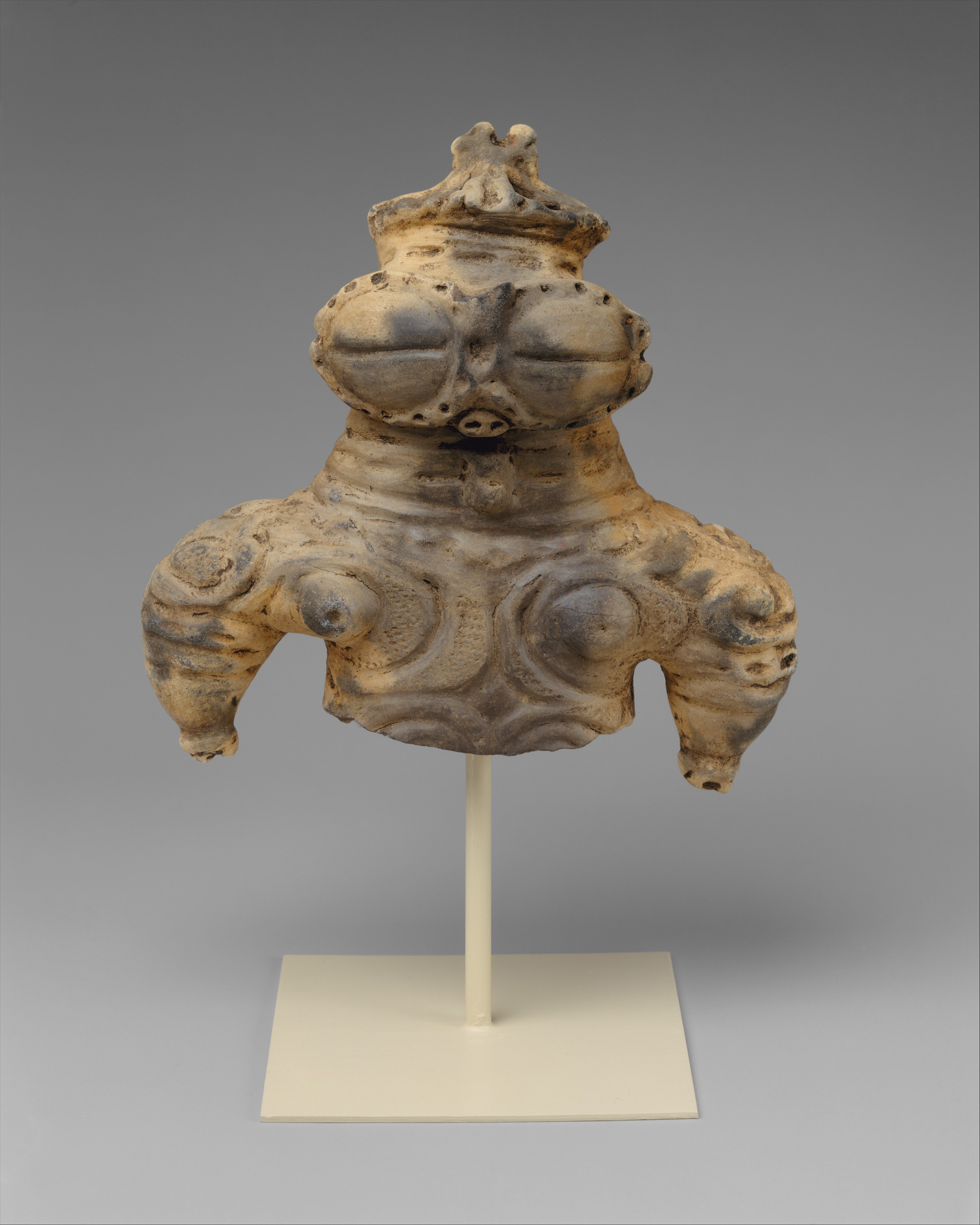
Dogū; 1000–300 BC; earthenware with cord-marked and incised decoration; height: 16.5 cm, width: 16.2 cm, depth: 7.9 cm; Metropolitan Museum of Art (New York City)

Jar; circa 100 BC-100 AD; burnished earthenware; diameter: 29.8 cm, overall: 19 cm; Cleveland Museum of Art (Cleveland, Ohio, US)

Dōtaku; 100-200 AD; cast bronze; overall: 97.8 x 48.9 cm; Cleveland Museum of Art

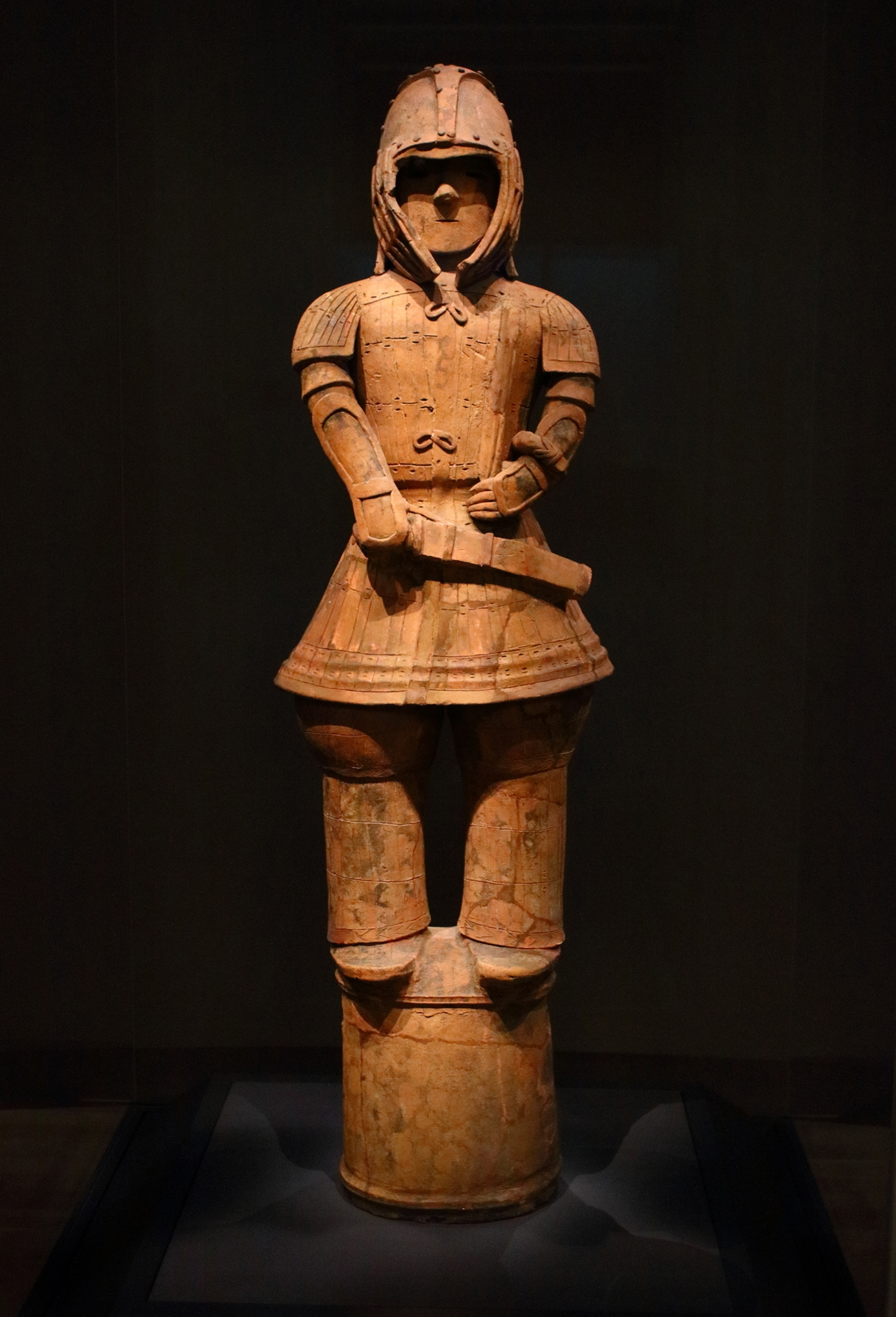
The Warrior in Keiko Armor; 6th century; haniwa (terracotta tomb figurine); height: 130.5 cm; Tokyo National Museum (Japan)

== Mesoamerica ==
=== Olmec ===
The ancient Olmec "Bird Vessel" and bowl, both ceramic and dating to circa 1000 BC as well as other ceramics are produced in kilns capable of exceeding approximately 900 °C. The only other prehistoric culture known to have achieved such high temperatures is that of Ancient Egypt.

Much Olmec art is highly stylized and uses iconography reflective of the religious meaning of the artworks. Some Olmec art, however, is surprisingly naturalistic, displaying an accuracy of the depiction of human anatomy perhaps equaled in the pre-Columbian New World only by the best Maya Classic era art. Olmec art forms emphasize monumental statuary and small jade carvings. A common theme is to be found in representations of a divine jaguar. Olmec figurines were also found abundantly through their period.

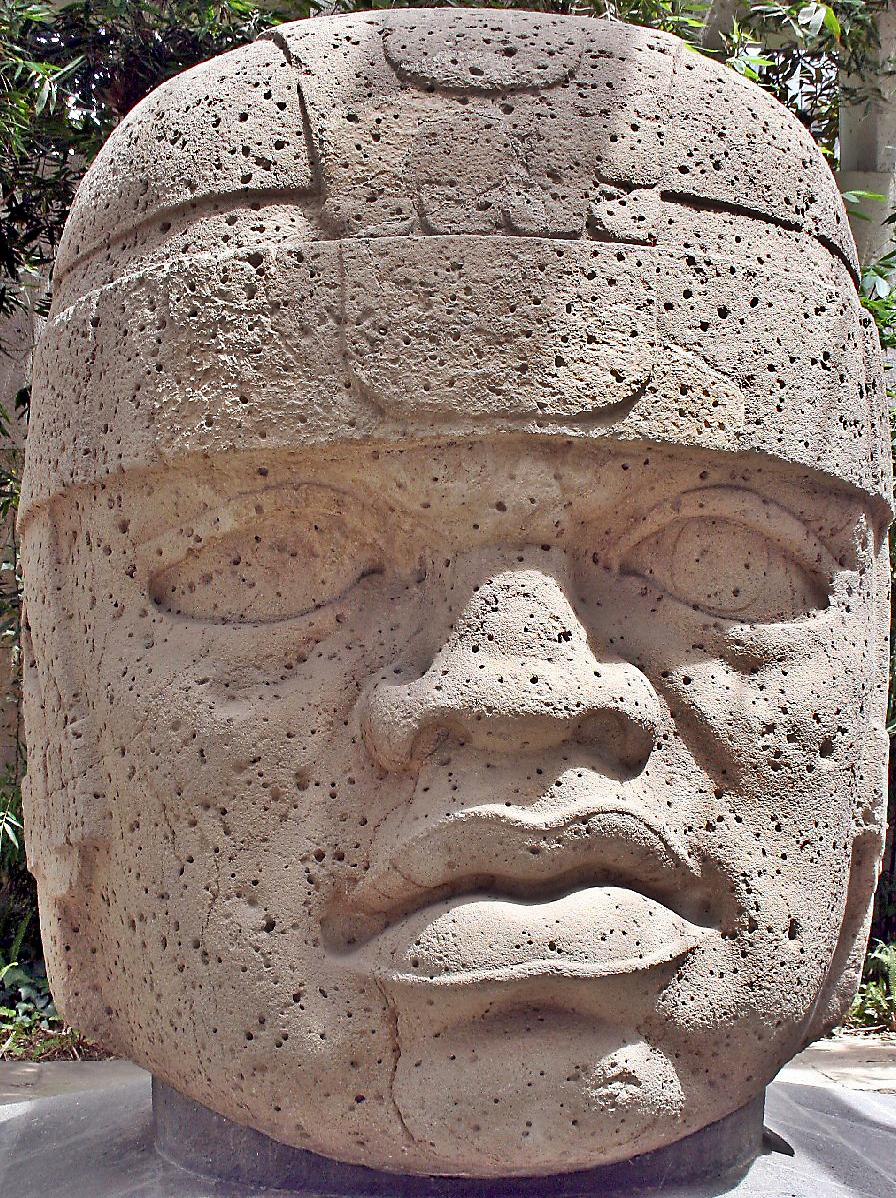
Colossal Head N° 1 of San Lorenzo. A historical person, likely an Olmec leader, is depicted in this monumental sculpture found at San Lorenzo (in Tabasco, Mexico), a principal Olmec centre

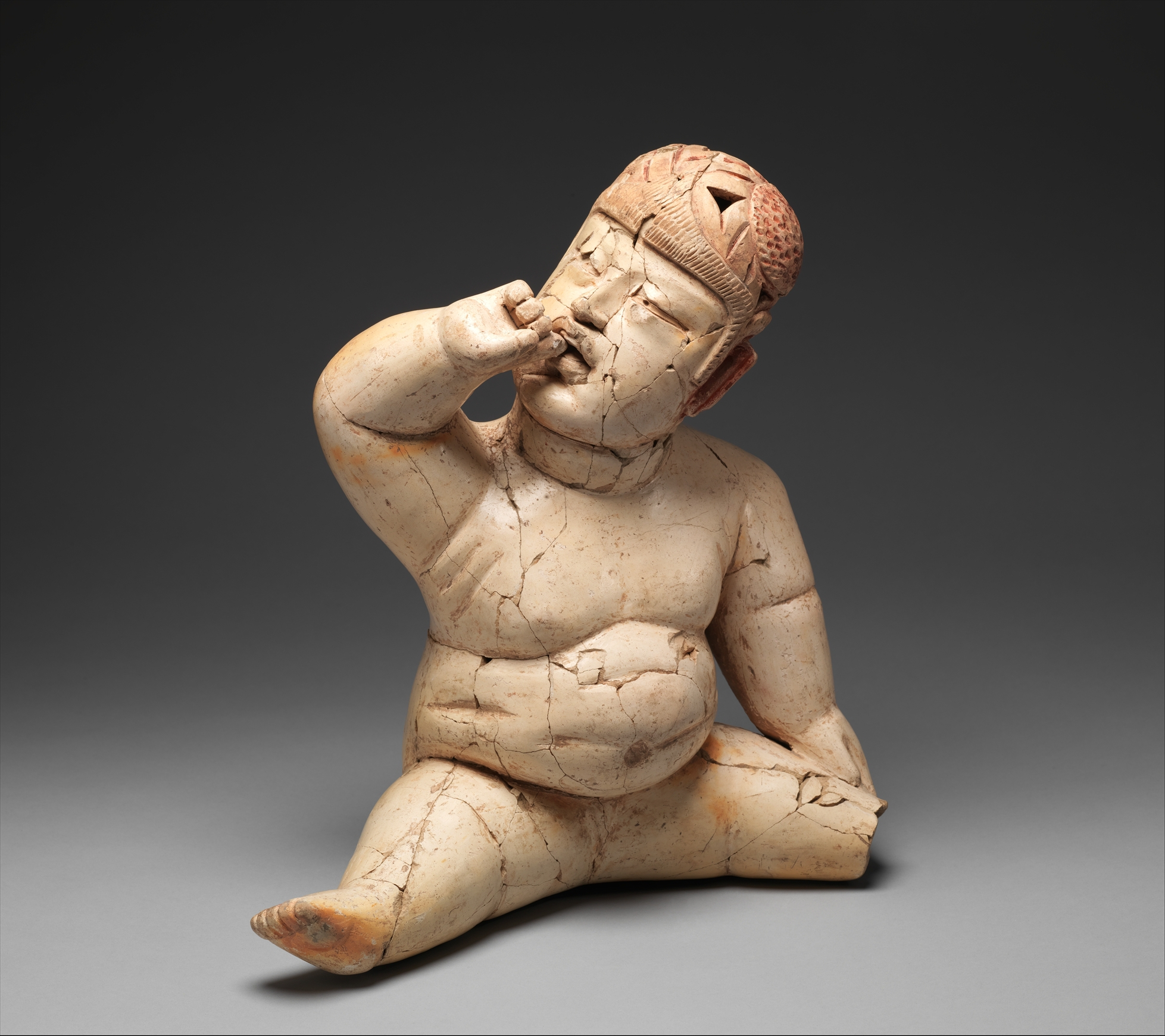
Seated figurine; 12th–9th century BC; painted ceramic; height: 34 cm, width: 31.8 cm, depth: 14.6 cm; Metropolitan Museum of Art (New York City)

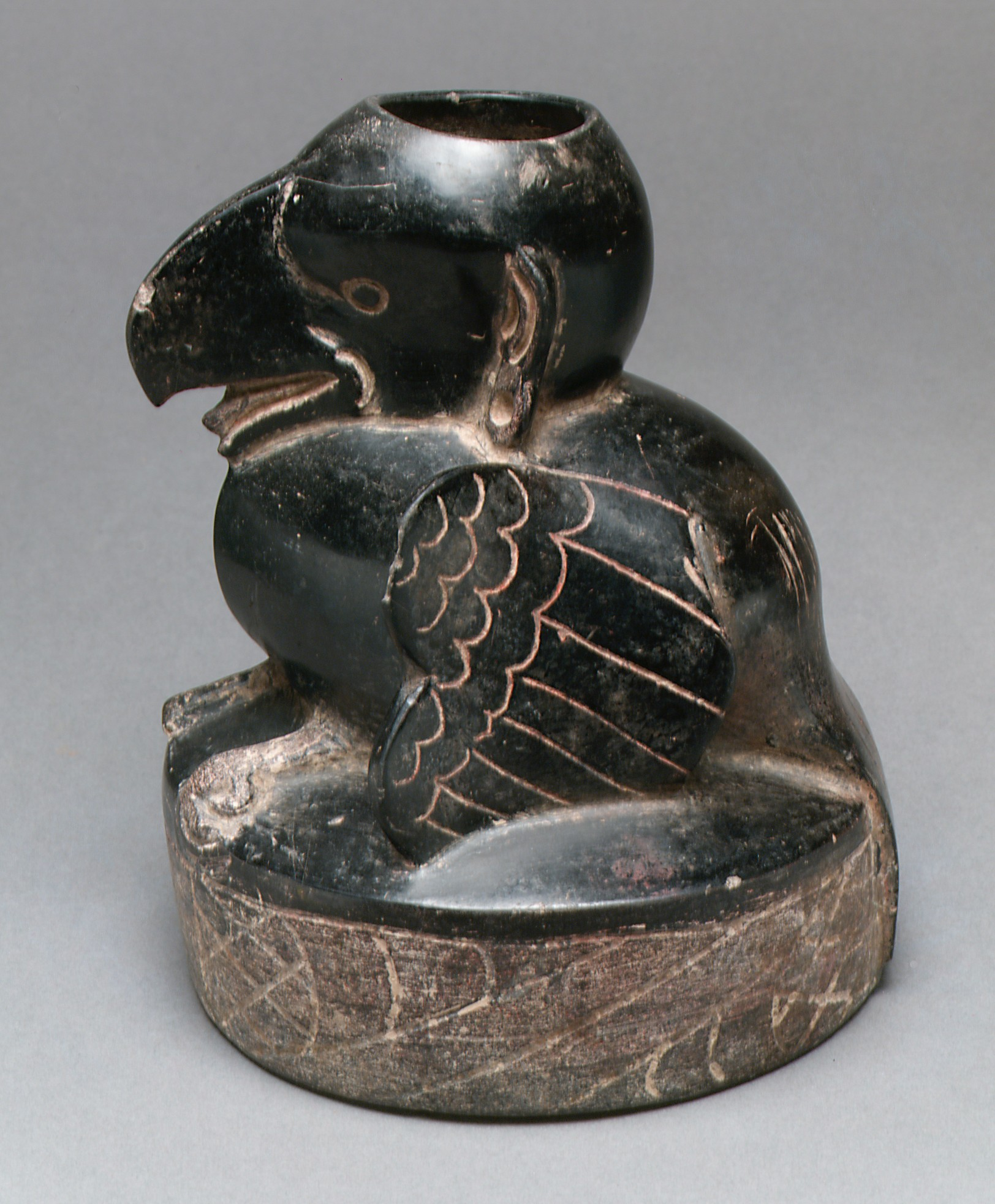
Bird-shaped vessel; 12th–9th century BC; ceramic with red ochre; height: 16.5 cm; Metropolitan Museum of Art

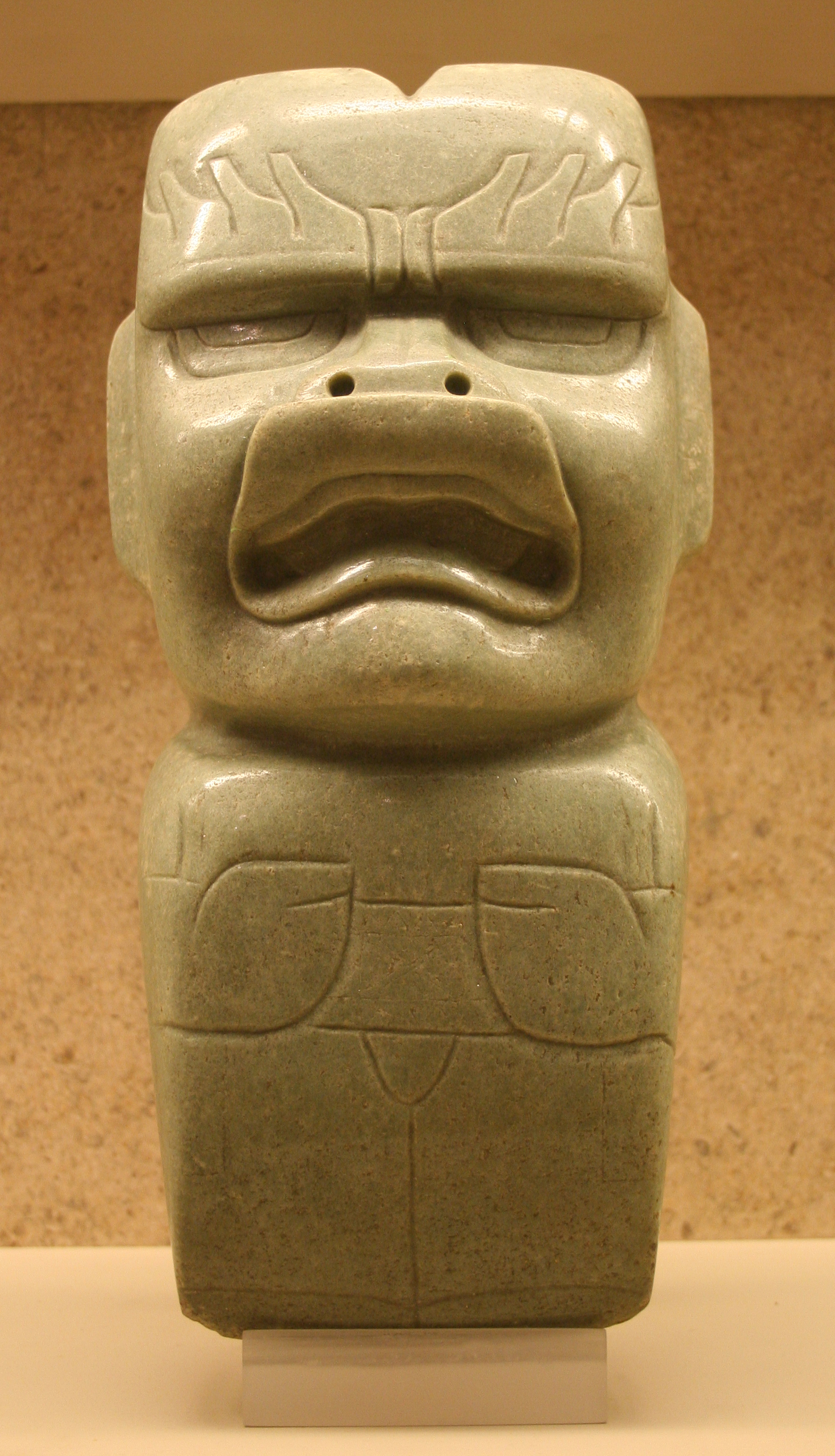
Kunz axe; 1200–400 BC; polished green quartz (aventurine); height: 29 cm, width: 13.5 cm; British Museum (London)

== See also ==
- History of art
- Timeline of art
