= Werner Doehner =

Hindenburg disaster survivor

Werner Gustav Doehner (March 14, 1929 – November 8, 2019) was a German-born Mexican and American electrical engineer and last living survivor of the Hindenburg disaster, when the German passenger-carrying rigid airship caught fire and was destroyed on May 6, 1937, during its attempt to dock with its mooring mast.

== Life ==
Doehner was born in Darmstadt, Germany, and spent his childhood in Mexico City, where his father was a pharmaceutical executive and general manager of Beick, Felix y Compañía, a prominent German wholesale drug company. He studied electrical engineering at the National Autonomous University of Mexico.

In 1967, Doehner married his wife, Engela, in Essen, West Germany, before they moved back to Mexico City. They were married for 52 years. In 1984, Doehner, his wife, and son Bernard emigrated to the United States where he worked as an electrical engineer. He retired from New England Electric System in Westborough, Massachusetts, in 1999. After retirement, Doehner and his wife lived in Colorado until 2018, when they moved to Laconia, New Hampshire.

Doehner died of pneumonia on November 8, 2019, at the age of 90.

== Hindenburg disaster ==
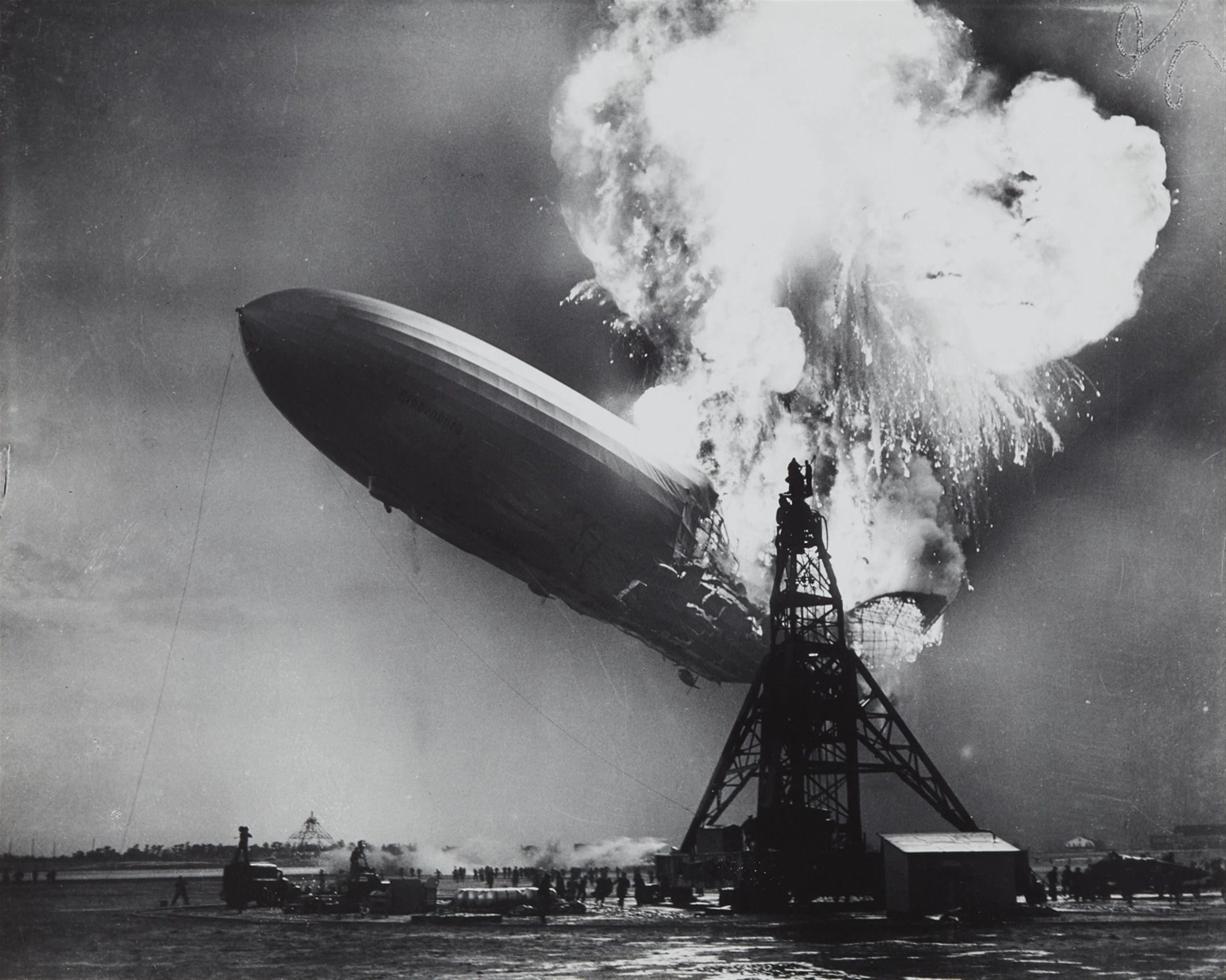
Doehner survived the Hindenburg disaster because his mother threw him and his brother out of the airship

Doehner, the last living link to the Hindenburg disaster, lived his life in relative low-profile obscurity. Doehner, his parents, older brother and sister—all naturalized Mexican nationals at the time—were returning to New Jersey from a vacation in Germany on the Hindenburg, planning to continue to Mexico City by train. His father, sister, and 33 others were killed when it caught fire and was destroyed during its attempt to dock with its mooring mast at Naval Air Station Lakehurst in Manchester Township on May 6, 1937. Hydrogen, exposed to air, had triggered an inferno somewhere on the airship, causing flames to flicker atop the airship, which then ignited the airship as it attempted but failed to land.

On the 80th anniversary of the disaster, in 2017, Doehner ended his self-imposed silence and told the Associated Press that his mother threw him and his older brother out of the airship while it was on fire: "We were close to a window, and my mother took my brother and threw him out. She grabbed me and fell back and then threw me out." His mother then jumped from the flaming airship to the ground after them, breaking her hip. Werner sustained burns to his face, hands, and lower right leg. His mother had burns to her face, legs, and hands. His brother had burns to his face and right hand. His mother received five blood transfusions; Werner and his brother received seven.

Doehner was hospitalized for several months, after which he was moved to a New York City hospital in August 1937 to receive skin grafts. According to his son, Bernie Doehner, he was left with lasting scars: "He had one all down his leg and he had nine skin graft operations and one of his ears was badly damaged." His vision was also affected for many months afterwards. He was discharged from the hospital in January 1938.

He eventually became historically significant when he was acknowledged as the last living survivor of the original 62 survivors who jumped from the dirigible. The last surviving crew member, Werner Franz, a cabin boy, died in 2014. The last surviving ground crew member, Frank Ward, died in 2015.
