= Alexander J. Dessler =

American astrophysicist (1928–2023)

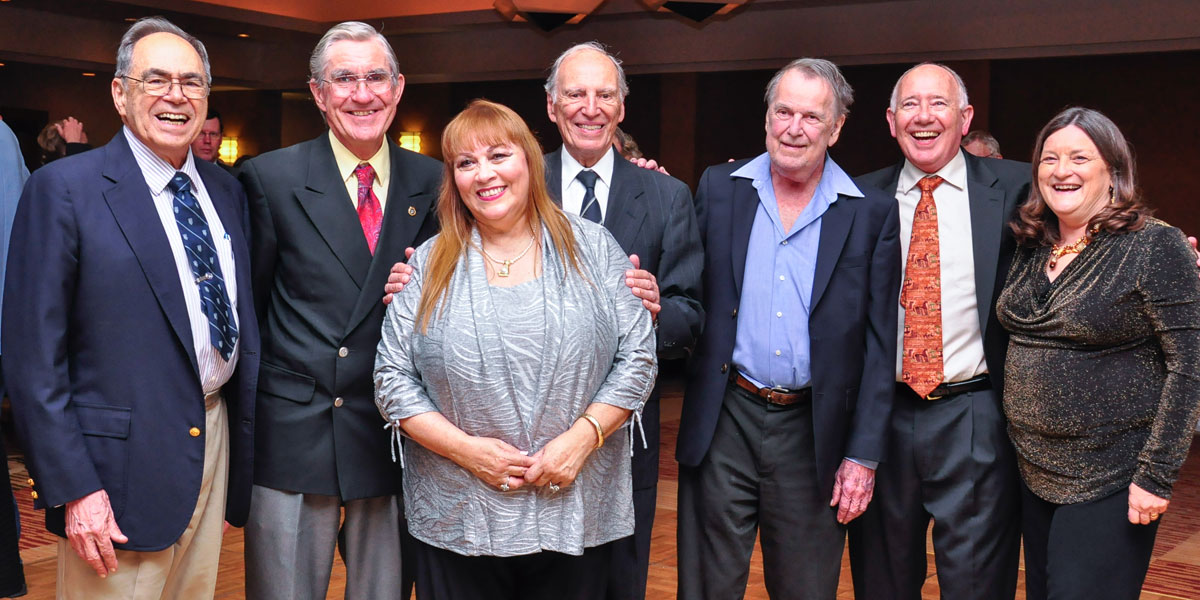
- Dessler (left) with other chairs of the Space Science Department
- Born: October 21, 1928; San Francisco, California, U.S.
- Died: April 9, 2023 (aged 94); Bryan, Texas, U.S.
- Education: California Institute of Technology, Duke University
- Known for: Earth's Magnetosphere; Jupiter's Magnetosphere; Founding Chairman of the Department of Space Science, Rice University.
- Spouse: Lorraine H. Dessler
- Awards: Macelwane Medal; Fleming Medal, Arctowski Medal
- Scientific career
- Fields: Magnetospheric Physics, Heliophysics, Jovian Physics
- Workplaces: Lockheed Missiles and Space Company, Rice University, Lunar and Planetary Laboratory, University of Arizona; Texas A & M University
- Thesis: (1956)
- Doctoral advisor: William M. Fairbank
- Doctoral students: James Carbary, David Criswell, David Cummings, Arthur Few, Henry Garrett. Thomas Hill, Milo Schield, William Sorenson, Yong Yang, Jie Zhan

Alexander J. Dessler (October 21, 1928 – April 9, 2023) was an American space scientist known for conceiving the term heliosphere and for founding the first Space Science Department in the United States.

== Early life and education ==
Dessler was born on October 21, 1928, in San Francisco, California, and received a B.S. in physics from the California Institute of Technology in 1952 and a Ph.D. in physics from Duke University in 1956. His PhD thesis was "The amplitude dependence of the velocity of second sound" under William M. Fairbank.

== Career ==
Dessler began his career at Lockheed Missiles and Space Company. In 1963, while at the Southwest Center for Advanced Studies, now University of Texas at Dallas, he was recruited by Rice University president Kenneth S. Pitzer to found the world's first university "Space Science" department, as a response to President John F. Kennedy's Moon Speech, delivered at Rice on September 12, 1962. The Department was the first truly multidisciplinary department in the University, bringing together Astronomy, Atmospheric Science Space Physics, Planetary Science, Atomic and Molecular Physics.

Dessler was emeritus professor of Space Physics and Astronomy at Rice University, active from 1963 to 1992. His research subject areas are magnetospheric physics, planetary magnetospheres, primarily of Jupiter and planetary science. He was founding chair of the Department of Space Science at Rice University, later known as the Department of Space Physics and Astronomy. Dessler served three terms as chair of the department and retired in 1992. During that interval, from 1982 to 1986 he was Director of the Space Science Laboratory at NASA's Marshall Space Flight Center.

His educational innovations include the use of Keller-method inquiry-based self-paced instruction starting in 1970 and was instrumental in encouraging women and minorities in science.

In 1993, Dessler became senior research scientist at the Lunar and Planetary Laboratory, University of Arizona, until 2007. He was retired and an adjunct professor of Space Physics at Texas A & M University.

At the Possible Relationships Between Solar Activity and Meteorological Phenomena symposium, Goddard Space Flight Center, November 7–8, 1973, Charles Greely Abbot's lifelong work on solar activity provided the foundation for research as a possible driver for Earth weather. In addressing the topic, A. J. Dessler commented that any increased energy received in Earth's troposphere due to increased solar activity is negligible, and that correlations alone do not establish causation. The challenges facing scientists with complex systems like the planet's weather require finding a coupling mechanism. He suggested to continue seeking physical mechanisms.

In 2004, Dessler refuted the proposition put forth by retired NASA scientist Addison Bain concerning the causes and combustion of the Hindenburg disaster. Dessler described Bain's incendiary paint theory as flawed science based on the stoichiometry of the coating's composition, the very slow burn rate of the metallic coating of the airship, and the lack of a high enough energy source to ignite the coating.

== Personal life and death ==
Dessler and his wife, Lorraine, were married for almost 70 years before her death in November 2021. They had four children, including Texas A & M atmospheric scientist Andrew Dessler.

Dessler died in Bryan, Texas on April 9, 2023, at the age of 94.

== Awards and honors ==
- 1963 - American Geophysical Union Macelwane Medal. This also was the occasion of being named Fellow of the American Geophysical Union
- 1984 - Soviet Geophysical Committee, Medal for Contributions to International Geophysics
- 1988 - Rotary National, Stellar Award for Academic Development
- 1993 - American Geophysical Union, John Adam Fleming Medal Winner
- 1996 - Royal Swedish Academy of Sciences, Foreign Member
- 2003 - American Geophysical Union, William Kaula Award
- 2015 - National Academy of Sciences, Arctowski Medal

== Publications ==
=== Books authored ===
- Physics of the Jovian Magnetosphere

=== Selected articles ===
- Dessler, A. J., Early History of Rice University Space Science Department.
- Dessler, A. J. and E. N. Parker, Hydromagnetic theory of geomagnetic storms.
- Dessler, A. J., Solar wind and interplanetary magnetic field.
- Dessler, A. J. and R. J. Talbot, Jr., Comment on personalized instruction: A summary of comparative research 1967–1974.
- Hill, T. W. and A. J. Dessler, Plasma motions in planetary magnetospheres.
- Hill, T. W., A. J. Dessler, and F. C. Michel, Configuration of the Jovian magnetosphere.
- Dessler, A. J., The Role of Space Science in Graduate Education.
- Dessler, A. J., The Role of Basic Research in Universities.
