= Hindenburg disaster newsreel footage =

1937 film and audio

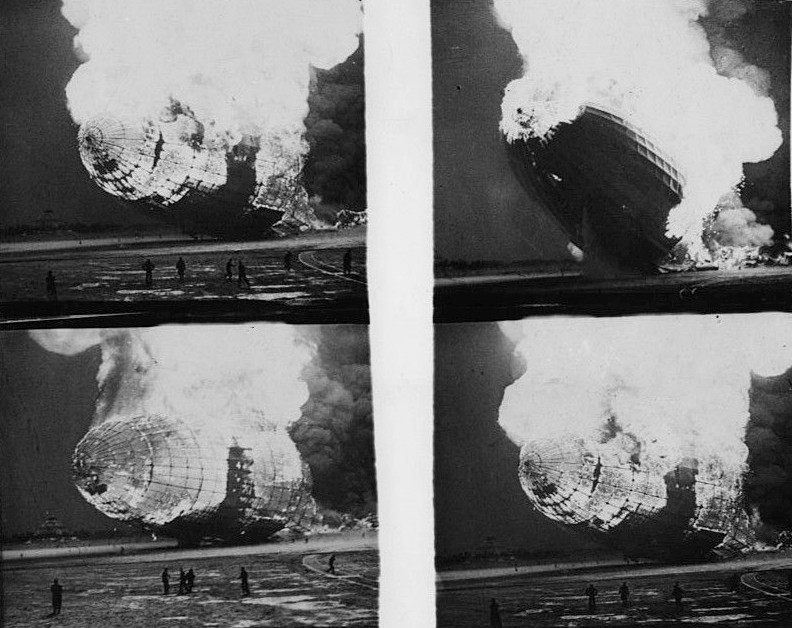
Composite screenshots of the crash from the Pathé newsreel.

Live acetate disc recording from the scene of the Hindenburg disaster

Newsreel footage of the May 6, 1937 Hindenburg disaster, where the zeppelin LZ 129 Hindenburg crashed and burned down, was filmed by several companies.

The film is frequently shown with narration, by WLS (AM) announcer Herbert Morrison, who was narrating a field recording on to an acetate disc, and was present to watch the zeppelin's arrival. Morrison's commentary was recorded by engineer Charles Nehlsen, but not broadcast until the next day on May 7, 1937, one of the first times that recordings of a news event were ever broadcast. In 2002, the audio recording was selected for preservation into the Library of Congress National Recording Registry. It has since been combined with the separately filmed newsreel footage. Most of the original newsreels have their own narration, and many composite edits have been made for documentaries dubbed with Morrison's commentary.

Four newsreel teams were in attendance at the time of the disaster. They were positioned close to each other and adjacent to the mooring mast for the airship. As a result, the newsreels do not show the mooring mast for the airship to be moored (other mooring masts appear in the background in many of the reels), unlike many of the press photographs which were taken farther away which show the mast as well as two of the newsreel cameramen with their cameras mounted atop of newsreel trucks. None of the newsreels captured the initial signs of disaster as the cameras had momentarily stopped filming after the ground crew caught the landing ropes (the fire started approximately four minutes after the first starboard rope was dropped at 7:21). At least one amateur film, taken by Harold N. Schenck, is known to exist, showing a side view of the stern on fire and the tail crashing to the ground.

In 1997, the original reels were selected for preservation in the United States National Film Registry as being "culturally, historically, or aesthetically significant."

== List of footage ==
There are five known newsreels of the fire, released by Pathé News, Paramount News, Movietone News, Hearst News of the Day/Universal Newsreel, and the fifth is of unknown origin. In addition, there is one known amateur film, by Harold N. Schenck.

=== Pathé ===
Hindenburg disaster newsreel captured by William Deeke for Pathé News

Cameraman William Deeke filmed the scenes in this newsreel. The footage shows the Hindenburg making its final sharp turn to starboard while dropping ballast three times before skidding to port and dropping her landing lines. The narrator describes the Hindenburg as a "puny plaything in the mighty grip of fate", foreshadowing the stern-heaviness and dumping of water ballast as a "grim note of impending tragedy." Deeke had focused the camera on the ground crew before he stopped filming. Although his camera was focused on the airship the moment it caught fire, the camera malfunctioned and it became necessary for him to set up a hand crank, which he only started to use when ship's tail was on the ground and the side collapsed inward. As a result, the Pathé News reel is actually the shortest in showing the crash. The footage also suffers from slight camera shake. The newsreel was edited to show the ground crew footage prior to the fire with an explosion sound effect, giving the false impression the ship was exploding while the camera was focused to the ground. Two distinct still frames flash to transition between the ground crew scene and the footage of the fire; these appear to be from footage taken earlier of the ship's landing approach which was edited out of the final reel.

=== Fox Movietone ===
The Fox Movietone footage was filmed by Al Gold (who filmed the fire sequence shown in the newsreel), Larry Kennedy and Deon de Titta. Gold stated that he was filming the ground crew when the fire started. However, the Movietone newsreel shows the ground crewmen catching the ropes early on, and it appears Gold's camera only started to film the fire as the airship's stern touched the ground. Kennedy and de Titta were closer to the airship when the fire started and had to run. Soundman Addison Tice was present as well, and recorded some of the audio of the disaster. Although the explosion sound in the newsreel was simulated, some of the audio may have been from the crash, as someone can be heard saying "you're alright now Al!".

=== Universal/Hearst News of the Day ===
Universal Newsreel of the Hindenburg disaster

The Universal cameraman stationed at the air field left early due to the bad weather and went to see a Broadway play. However, James J. Seeley filmed the disaster for Hearst's News of the Day and Universal used his footage of the fire for their report. Both newsreel companies had taken their own aerial footage of the airship over New York hours before the fire. One scene in the Universal reel showing passengers looking out of the windows, was taken from Universal's 1936 newsreel of one of the Hindenburg's previous transatlantic crossings.

This newsreel is the longest in showing the fire sequence. The camera pans upward showing the stern ablaze as it crashes down and the fire burns through the nose like a blowtorch. It does not show what is happening below the burning airship when it crashes to the ground as the camera is focused more on the fire itself until the bow nears the ground. At this point, navy ground crewmen can be seen walking close to the camera.

The Hearst News of the Day Newsreel is much less common than the Universal reel. A high quality government archive copy of the Universal version also appeared online (which also includes the Universal Newsreel of the wreckage a few days after, and the Pathé newsreel). Compared to the Universal edit, the Hearst newsreel has some different shots of the airship over New York and also shows footage of passengers inside the ship from 1936. The same narration is used in the Gaumont British News report which uses footage from both Universal/Hearst and Movietone. Another redub of the newsreel is the "Victoria Record".

=== Paramount ===
The Paramount was filmed by Tommy Craven using an Eyemo, which had interchangeable lenses. During the landing approach, Craven alternated between wide-angle and telephoto views of the airship. As the ship dropped its ropes another cameraman can be seen. Craven was using the telephoto lens when the fire started (the footage starts a few seconds after the Hearst reel), giving a close-up view of the fire and people running away from the airship. The footage also shows flames burning away the ship's name as it crashes to the ground. Craven, an out-of-work news photographer aspiring to become a newsreel cameraman, was given the chance by Paramount to cover the Hindenburg's arrival, which landed him the job at Paramount News. The footage has sometimes been misattributed to Al Mingalone. In 1957, Craven made an appearance in the Canadian game show Front Page Challenge recounting his experience filming the disaster.

=== Amateur footage ===
There is one known amateur film of the disaster, a 25-second 8 mm home movie by Harold N. Schenck, giving a side-rear view of the disaster. While it was known by the Lakehurst Historical Society for many years and shown at an event for the 50th anniversary of the disaster, it was not publicly broadcast until May 2014 by NBC. A restoration and analysis of the film was performed for the 2021 Nova documentary Hindenburg: The New Evidence. While missing the initial stages of the fire, it shows the fire a few seconds earlier than the Universal/Hearst newsreel, seconds before the airship's tail started to fall.
