= Hindenburg disaster =

1937 airship fire in the US

Coordinates: 40.03035°N 74.32575°W

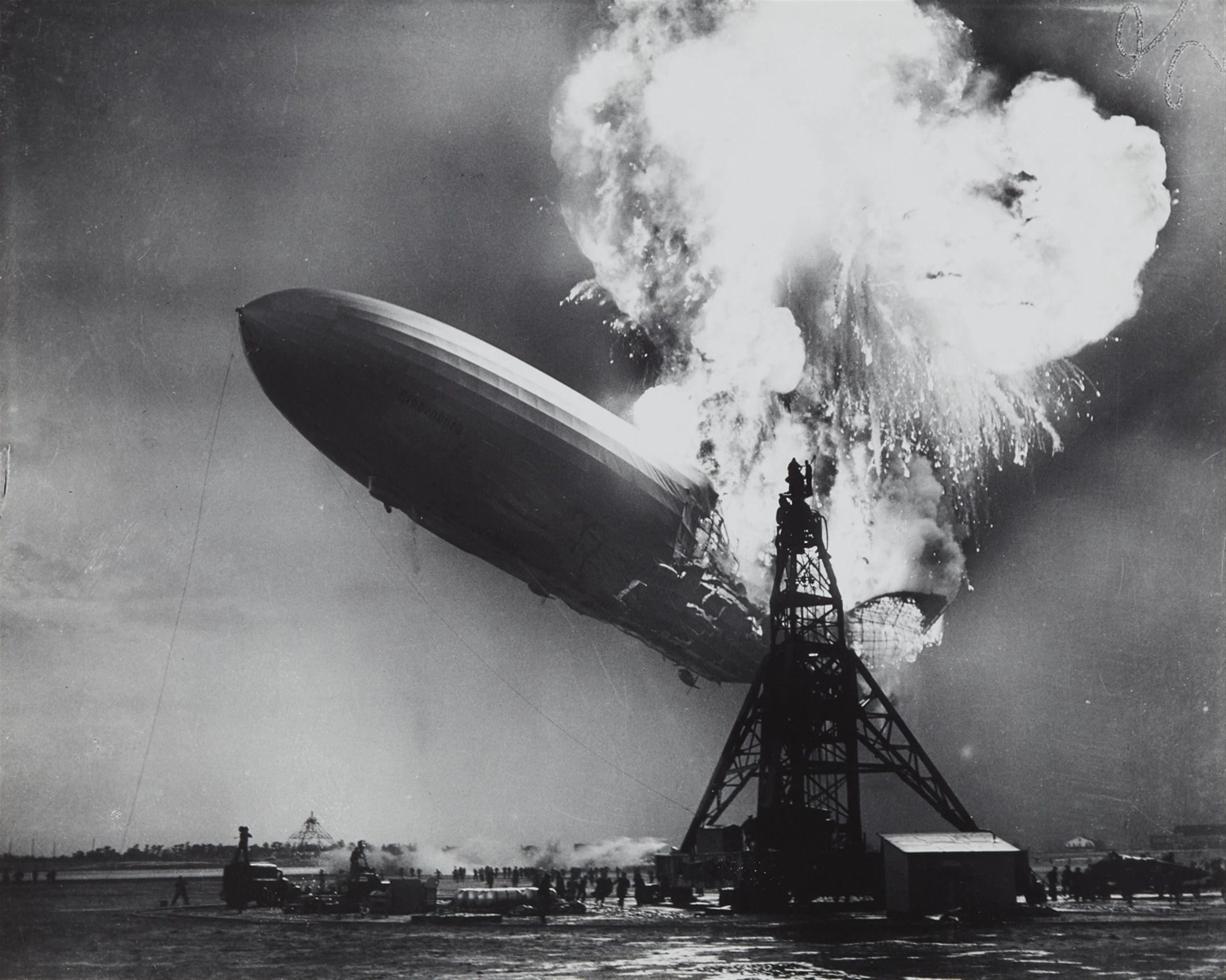
- Photograph of the Hindenburg descending in flames

Accident
- Date: May 6, 1937; 89 years ago
- Summary: Caught fire during landing
- Site: NAS Lakehurst, Manchester Township, New Jersey, U.S.
- Total fatalities: 36

Aircraft
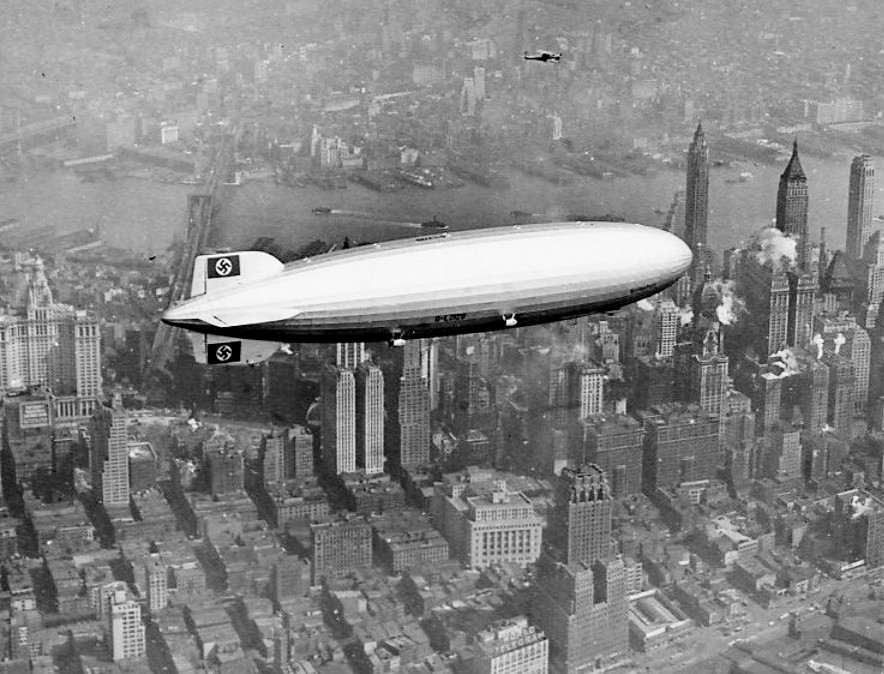
- D-LZ129 Hindenburg, the airship involved, seen over New York City shortly before the disaster
- Aircraft type: Hindenburg-class airship
- Aircraft name: Hindenburg
- Operator: Deutsche Zeppelin-Reederei
- Registration: D-LZ129
- Flight origin: Frankfurt am Main, Nazi Germany
- Destination: NAS Lakehurst, New Jersey, U.S.
- Occupants: 97
- Passengers: 36
- Crew: 61
- Fatalities: 35
- Injuries: Most of the 62 survivors
- Survivors: 62

Ground casualties
- Ground fatalities: 1
- Ground injuries: 1

The Hindenburg disaster was an airship accident that occurred on May 6, 1937, in Manchester Township, New Jersey, United States. The LZ 129 Hindenburg (Luftschiff Zeppelin #129; Registration: D-LZ 129) was a Nazi German commercial passenger-carrying rigid airship, the lead ship of the Hindenburg class, the longest class of flying machine and the largest airship by envelope volume. Filled with hydrogen, it caught fire and was destroyed during its attempt to dock with its mooring mast at Naval Air Station Lakehurst. The accident caused 35 fatalities (13 passengers and 22 crewmen) among the 97 people on board (36 passengers and 61 crewmen), and an additional fatality on the ground.

The disaster was the subject of newsreel coverage, photographs and Herbert Morrison's recorded radio eyewitness reports from the landing field, which were broadcast the next day. A variety of theories have been put forward for both the cause of ignition and the initial fuel for the ensuing fire. The publicity shattered public confidence in the giant passenger-carrying rigid airship and marked the abrupt end of the airship era.

== Flight ==
The Hindenburg was the successor of the Graf Zeppelin (LZ 127), which had been launched in 1928. After her maiden flight on March 4, 1936 the Hindenburg had made ten trips to the United States without any incidents. After opening its 1937 season by completing a single round-trip passage to Rio de Janeiro, Brazil, in late March, the Hindenburg departed from Frankfurt, Germany, on the evening of May 3, on the first of ten round trips between Europe and the United States that were scheduled for its second year of commercial service. American Airlines had contracted with the operators of the Hindenburg to shuttle passengers from Lakehurst to Newark for connections to airplane flights.

Except for strong headwinds that slowed its progress, the Atlantic crossing of the Hindenburg was unremarkable until the airship attempted an early-evening landing at Lakehurst three days later on May 6. Although carrying only half its full capacity of passengers (36 of 70) and crewmen (61, including 21 crewman trainees) during the accident flight, the Hindenburg was fully booked for its return flight.

The airship was hours behind schedule when it passed over Boston on the morning of May 6, and its landing at Lakehurst was expected to be further delayed because of afternoon thunderstorms. Advised of the poor weather conditions at Lakehurst, Captain Max Pruss charted a course over Manhattan Island, causing a public spectacle as people rushed out into the streets to catch sight of the airship. After passing over the field at 4:00 p.m. EDT (20:00 UTC), Pruss took passengers on a tour over the seashore of New Jersey while waiting for the weather to clear. After being notified at 6:22 p.m. that the storms had passed, Pruss directed the airship back to Lakehurst to make its landing almost half a day late. As this would leave much less time than anticipated to service and prepare the airship for its scheduled departure back to Europe, the public was informed that they would not be permitted at the mooring location or be able to come aboard the Hindenburg during its stay in port.

=== Landing timeline ===
Around 7:00 p.m. EDT (23:00 UTC), at an altitude of 650 feet (200 m), the Hindenburg made its final approach to the Lakehurst Naval Air Station. This was to be a high landing, known as a flying moor because the airship would drop its landing ropes and mooring cable at a high altitude, and then be winched down to the mooring mast. This type of landing maneuver would reduce the number of ground crewmen but would require more time. Although the high landing was a common procedure for American airships, the Hindenburg had performed this maneuver only a few times in 1936 while landing in Lakehurst.

At 7:09 p.m., the airship made a sharp full-speed left turn to the west around the landing field because the ground crew was not ready. At 7:11 p.m., it turned back toward the landing field and valved gas. All engines idled ahead and the airship began to slow. Captain Pruss ordered aft engines full astern at 7:14 p.m. while at an altitude of 394 ft (120 m), to try to brake the airship.

At 7:17 p.m., the wind shifted direction from east to southwest, and Captain Pruss ordered a second sharp turn starboard, making an s-shaped flightpath toward the mooring mast. At 7:18 p.m., as the final turn progressed, Pruss ordered 660, 660, and 1100 lb (300, 300, and 500 kg) of water ballast released in successive drops because the airship was stern-heavy. The forward gas cells were also valved. As these measures failed to bring the ship in trim, six men (three of whom were killed in the accident) (Note: According to an annotated ship diagram submitted to the U.S. Commerce Department's Board of Inquiry into the disaster, 12 men were in the forward section of the ship at the time of the fire: Ludwig Felber (apprentice "elevator man"); Alfred Bernhardt (helmsman); Erich Spehl (rigger); Ernst Huchel (senior elevator man); Rudi Bialas (engine mechanic); Alfred Stöckle (engine mechanic); Fritz Flackus (cook's assistant); Richard Müller (cook's assistant); Ludwig Knorr (chief rigger); Josef Leibrecht (electrician); Kurt Bauer (elevator man); and Alfred Grözinger (cook). Of these, only Leibrecht, Bauer, and Grözinger survived the fire. Examination of the unedited Board of Inquiry testimony transcripts (stored at the National Archives), combined with a landing stations chart in Dick & Robinson (1985, p. 212) indicates that the six off-watch men who were sent forward to trim the ship were Bialas, Stöckle, Flaccus, Müller, Leibrecht and Grözinger. The other men were at their previously assigned landing stations. More recent research found that it was not Bialas, but his colleague Walter Banholzer, who was sent forward along with the other five men.) were then sent to the bow to trim the airship.

At 7:21 p.m., while the Hindenburg was at an altitude of 295 ft (90 m), the mooring lines were dropped from the bow; the starboard line was dropped first, followed by the port line. The port line was overtightened as it was connected to the post of the ground winch. The starboard line had still not been connected. A light rain began to fall as the ground crew grabbed the mooring lines.

At 7:25 p.m., a few witnesses saw the fabric ahead of the upper fin flutter as if gas was leaking. Others reported seeing a dim blue flame – possibly static electricity, or St. Elmo's Fire – moments before the fire on top and in the back of the ship near the point where the flames first appeared. Several other eyewitness testimonies suggest that the first flame appeared on the port side just ahead of the port fin, and was followed by flames that burned on top. Commander Rosendahl testified to the flames in front of the upper fin being "mushroom-shaped". One witness on the starboard side reported a fire beginning lower and behind the rudder on that side. On board, people heard a muffled detonation and those in the front of the ship felt a shock as the port trail rope overtightened; the officers in the control car initially thought the shock was caused by a broken rope.

=== The disaster ===
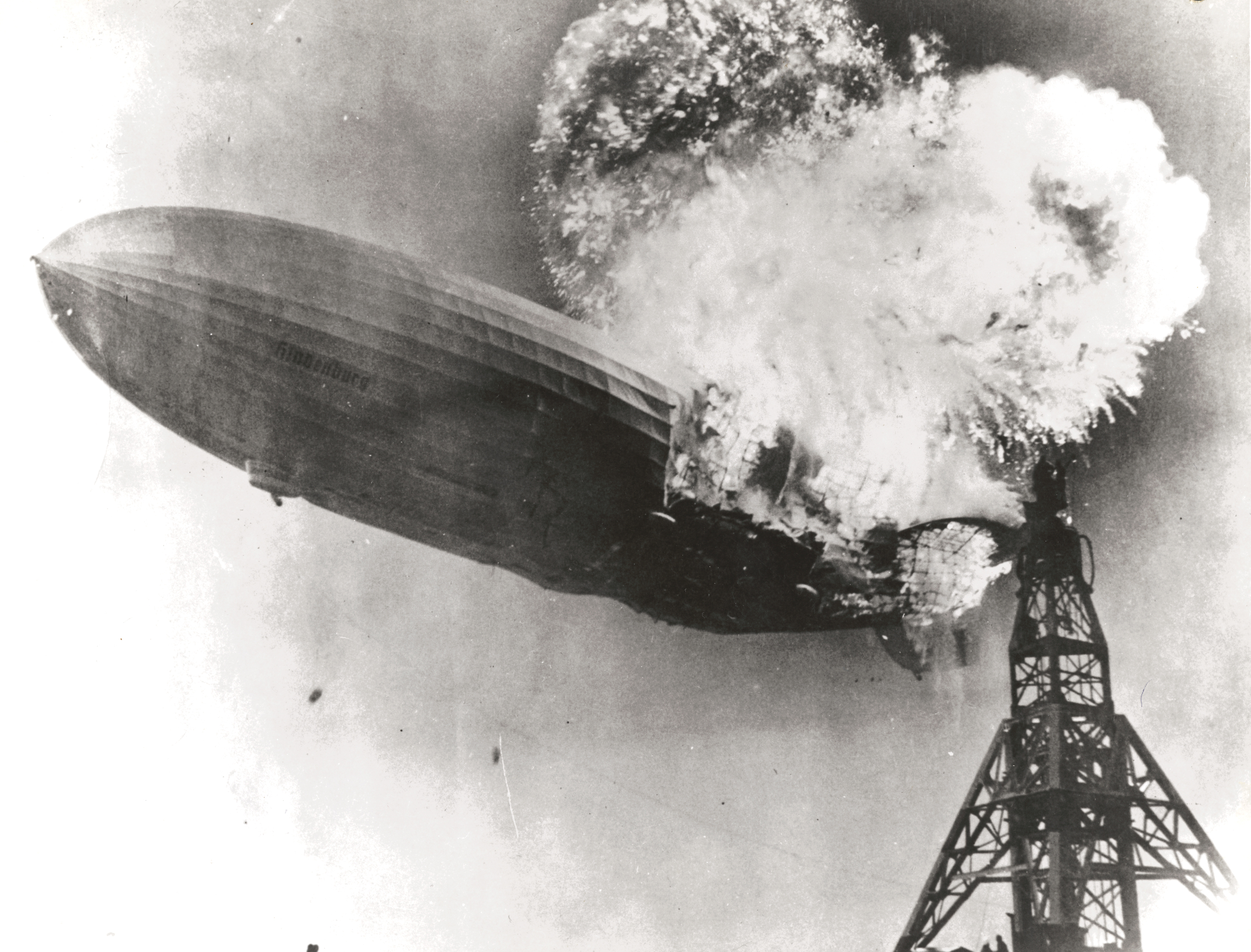
Hindenburg begins to fall seconds after catching fire.

At 7:25 p.m. EDT (23:25 UTC), the Hindenburg caught fire and quickly became engulfed in flames. Eyewitness statements disagree as to where the fire initially broke out; several witnesses on the port side saw yellow-red flames first jump forward of the top fin near the ventilation shaft of cells four and five. Other witnesses on the port side noted the fire actually began just ahead of the horizontal port fin, only then followed by flames in front of the upper fin. One, with views of the starboard side, saw flames beginning lower and farther aft, near cell one behind the rudders. Inside the airship, helmsman Helmut Lau, who was stationed in the lower fin, testified to hearing a muffled detonation and looked up to see a bright reflection on the front bulkhead of gas cell four, which, "suddenly disappeared by the heat." As other gas cells started to catch fire, the fire spread more to the starboard side and the ship dropped rapidly. Although the landing was being filmed by cameramen from four newsreel teams and at least one spectator, with numerous photographers also being at the scene, no footage or photographs are known to exist of the moment the fire started.

The flames quickly spread forward, first consuming cells one to nine, as the rear end of the structure imploded. Almost instantly, two tanks (it is disputed whether they contained water or fuel) burst out of the hull, as a result of the shock of the blast. Buoyancy was lost on the stern of the ship, and the bow lurched upward while the ship's back broke; the falling stern stayed in trim.

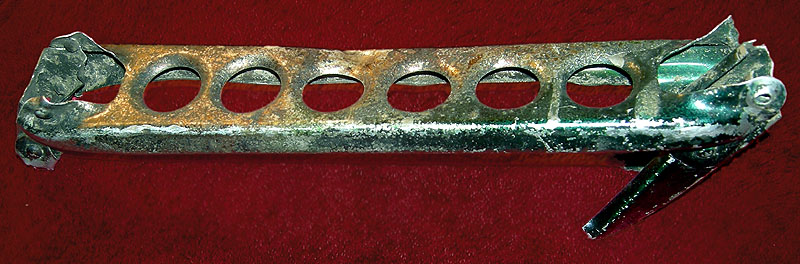
A fire-damaged 9" duralumin cross brace from the frame of the Hindenburg, salvaged in May 1937 from the crash site at NAS Lakehurst, New Jersey

As the tail of the Hindenburg crashed into the ground, a burst of flame came out of the nose, killing 9 of the 12 crew members in the bow. There was still gas in the bow section of the ship, so it continued to point upward as the stern collapsed down. The cell behind the passenger decks ignited as the side collapsed inward, and the scarlet lettering reading Hindenburg was erased by flames as the bow descended. The airship's gondola wheel touched the ground, causing the bow to bounce up slightly as one final gas cell burned away. At this point, most of the fabric on the hull had also burned away and the bow finally crashed to the ground. Although the hydrogen had finished burning, the Hindenburg's diesel fuel burned for several more hours. In the face of this catastrophe, Chief Petty Officer Frederick J. "Bull" Tobin, in command of the Navy landing party for the airship, and a survivor of the crashed American military airship, USS Shenandoah, shouted the order, "Navy men, stand fast!" to successfully rally his personnel to conduct rescue operations, despite the considerable danger from the flames.

The time that it took, from the first signs of disaster to the bow crashing to the ground, is reported as 32, 34, or 37 seconds. Since none of the newsreel cameras were filming the airship when the fire first started, the time of the start can only be estimated from various eyewitness accounts and the duration of the longest footage of the crash. One analysis by NASA's Addison Bain gives the flame front spread rate across the fabric skin as about 49 ft/s (15 m/s) at some points during the crash, which would have resulted in a total destruction time of about 16 seconds.

Some of the duralumin framework of the airship was salvaged and shipped back to Germany, where it was recycled and used in the construction of military aircraft for the Luftwaffe, as were the frames of the LZ 127 Graf Zeppelin and LZ 130 Graf Zeppelin II, when both were scrapped in 1940.

In the days after the disaster, a board of inquiry was set up at Lakehurst to investigate the cause of the fire. The investigation by the US Commerce Department was headed by Colonel South Trimble Jr., while Hugo Eckener led the German commission.

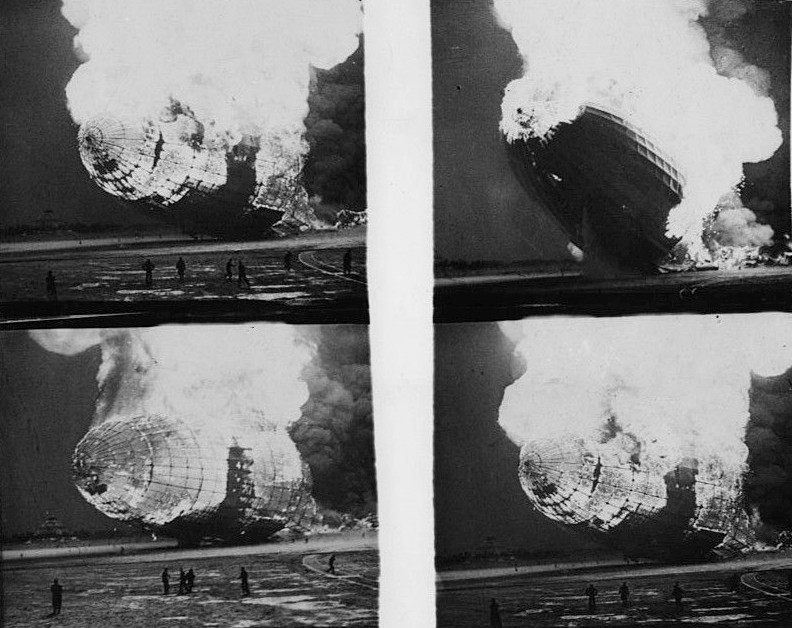
Hindenburg disaster sequence from the Pathé Newsreel, showing the bow nearing the ground

=== News coverage ===
Universal Newsreel

The disaster was well-documented. Heavy publicity about the first transatlantic passenger flight of the year by Zeppelin to the United States had attracted a large number of journalists to the landing. Thus many news crews were on-site at the time of the airship exploding, and so there was a significant amount of newsreel coverage and photographs, as well as Herbert Morrison's eyewitness report for radio station WLS in Chicago, a report that was broadcast the next day.

Although radio broadcasts were not routinely recorded at the time, an audio engineer and Morrison had chosen the arrival of the Hindenburg to experiment with recording for delayed broadcast and thus Morrison's narration of the disaster was preserved. Parts of Morrison's broadcast were later dubbed onto newsreel footage. That gave the impression that the words and film were recorded together, but that was not the case.

It's practically standing still now they've dropped ropes out of the nose of the ship; and (uh) they've been taken ahold of down on the field by a number of men. It's starting to rain again; it's... the rain had (uh) slacked up a little bit. The back motors of the ship are just holding it (uh) just enough to keep it from...It's burst into flames! It burst into flames and it's falling, it's crashing! Watch it; watch it, folks get out of the way; Get out of the way; Get this, Charlie; get this, Charlie! It's fire... and it's crashing! It's crashing, terrible! Oh, my! Get out of the way, please! It's burning and bursting into flames and the... and it's falling on the mooring mast and all the folks beneath it! This is terrible; this is the worst of the worst catastrophes in the world. Oh it's... The flame's climbing! Oh, it's four or five hundred feet into the sky, and it's a terrific crash, ladies and gentlemen. There's smoke, and there's flames, now, and the frame is crashing to the ground, not quite to the mooring mast. Oh, the humanity, and all the passengers screaming around here! I don't believe it! I can't even talk to people whose friends are on there! Ah! It's... it... it's a... ah! I... I can't talk, ladies and gentlemen. Honest: it's just laying there, a mass of smoking wreckage. Ah! And everybody can hardly breathe and talk and the screaming. I... I... I'm sorry. Honest: I... I can hardly breathe. I... I'm going to step inside, where I cannot see it. Charlie, that's terrible. Ah, ah... I can't. Listen, folks; I... I'm gonna have to stop for a minute because I've lost my voice. This is the worst thing I've ever witnessed.

— Herbert Morrison, Transcription of WLS radio broadcast describing the Hindenburg disaster.

Live radio broadcasting from the scene of the Hindenburg disaster

The newsreel footage was shot by four newsreel camera teams: Pathé News, Movietone News, Hearst News of the Day, and Paramount News. Al Gold of Fox Movietone News later received a Presidential Citation for his work. One of the most widely circulated photographs of the disaster (see photo at top of article), showing the airship crashing with the mooring mast in the foreground, was photographed by Sam Shere of International News Photos. When the fire started he did not have the time to put the camera to his eye and shot the photo "from the hip".

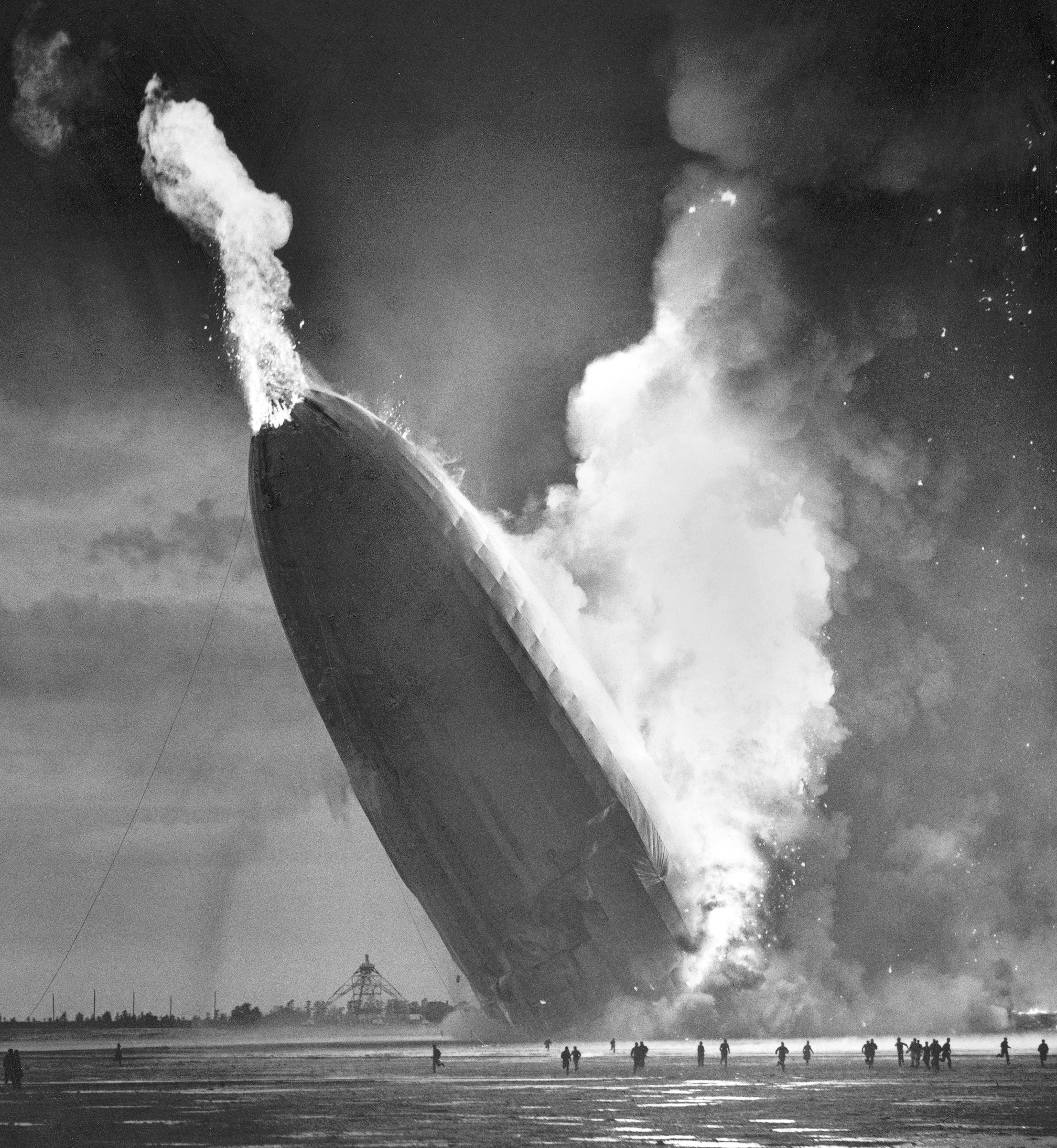
The fire bursts out of the nose of the Hindenburg, photographed by Murray Becker.

Murray Becker of Associated Press photographed the fire engulfing the airship while it was still on even keel using his 4 × 5 Speed Graphic camera. His next photograph, shows flames bursting out of the nose as the bow telescoped upward. In addition to professional photographers, spectators also photographed the crash. They were stationed in the spectators' area near Hangar No. 1, and had a side-rear view of the airship. Customs broker Arthur Cofod Jr. and 16-year-old Foo Chu both had Leica cameras with high-speed film, allowing them to take a larger number of photographs than the press photographers. Nine of Cofod's photographs were printed in Life magazine, while Chu's photographs were shown in the New York Daily News.

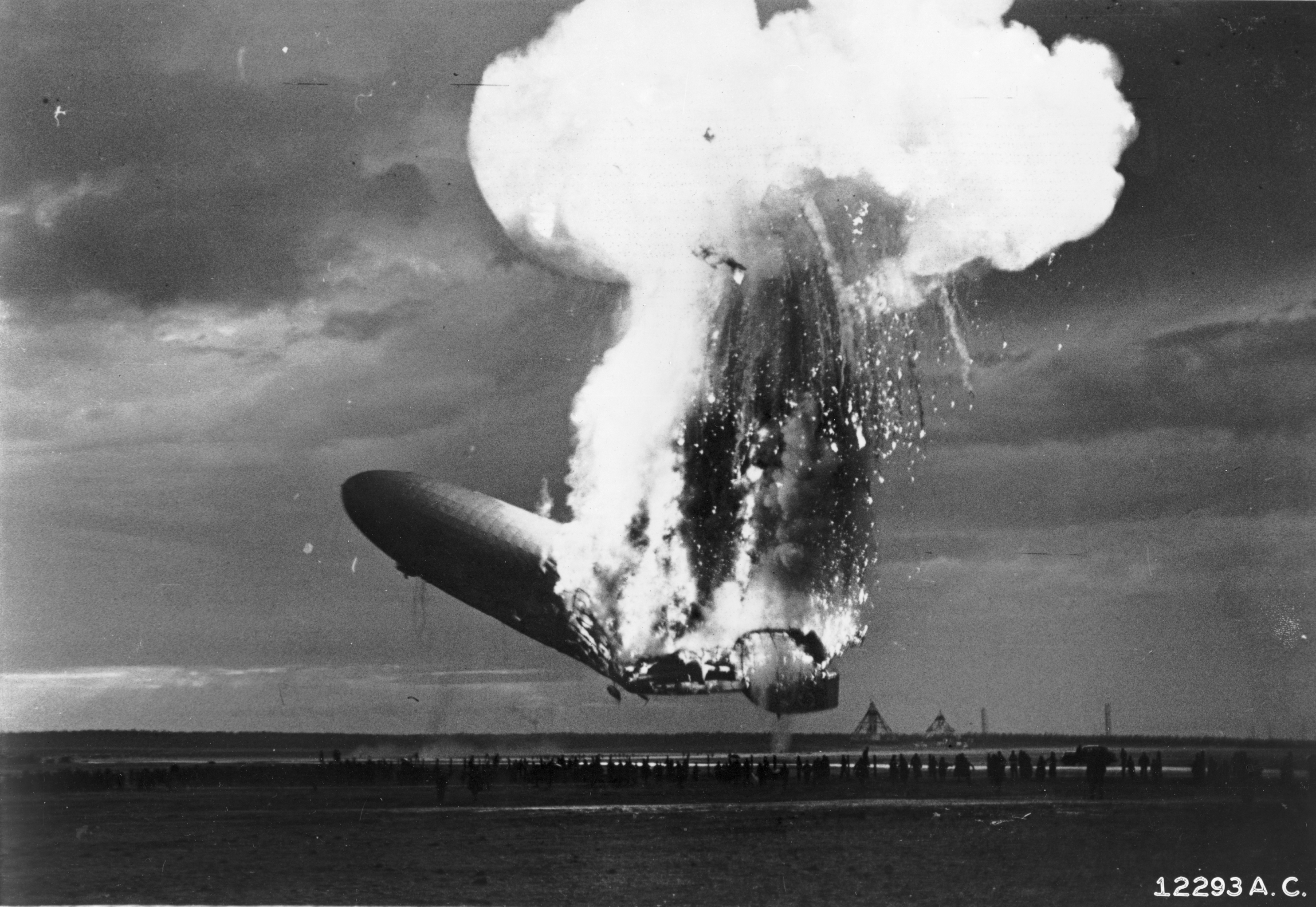
Photograph by Arthur Cofod Jr.

The newsreels and photographs, along with Morrison's passionate reporting, shattered public and industry faith in airships and marked the end of the giant passenger-carrying airships. Also contributing to the downfall of Zeppelins was the arrival of international passenger air travel and Pan American Airlines. Heavier-than-air aircraft regularly crossed the Atlantic and Pacific much faster than the 130 km/h (80 mph) speed of the Hindenburg.

In contrast to the media coverage in the United States, media coverage of the disaster in Germany was more subdued. Although some photographs of the disaster were published in newspapers, the newsreel footage was not released until after World War II. German victims were memorialized similarly to fallen war heroes, and grassroots movements to fund zeppelin construction (as happened after the 1908 crash of the LZ 4) were expressly forbidden by the Nazi government.

There had been a series of other airship accidents prior to the Hindenburg fire; many were caused by bad weather. The Graf Zeppelin had flown safely for more than 1.6 million kilometers (1.0 million miles), including the first circumnavigation of the globe by an airship. The Zeppelin company's promotions had prominently featured the fact that no passenger had been injured on any of its airships.

=== Fatalities ===
Of the 97 people on the airship, 35 died including 13 of the 36 passengers and 22 of the 61 crew; most survivors were severely burned. Among those killed was also one ground crewman, civilian linesman Allen Hagaman. Ten passengers (Note: Birger Brinck, Burtis John Dolan, Edward Douglas, Emma Pannes, Ernst Rudolf Anders, Fritz Erdmann, Hermann Doehner, John Pannes, Moritz Feibusch, Otto Reichold.) and sixteen crewmen (Note: Albert Holderried, mechanic; Alfred Stockle, engine mechanic; Alois Reisacher, mechanic; Emilie Imohof, hostess; Ernst Huchel, senior elevatorman; Ernst Schlapp, electrician; Franz Eichelmann, radio operator; Fritz Flackus, cook's assistant; Alfred Hitchcok, chief mechanic; Ludwig Knorr, chief rigger; Max Schulze, bar steward; Richard Muller, assistant chef; Robert Moser, mechanic; Rudi Bialas, engine mechanic; Wilhelm Dimmler, engineering officer; Willi Scheef, mechanic.) died in the crash or in the fire. The majority of the victims were burned to death, while others died jumping from the airship at an excessive height, or as a consequence of either smoke inhalation or falling debris. (Note: Some of the 26 people listed as immediate victims may have actually died immediately after the disaster in the air station's infirmary, but being identified only after some time, along with the corpses of the victims who died in the fire.) Six other crew members, (Note: Alfred Bernhardt, helmsman; Erich Spehl, rigger; Ernst August Lehmann, director of flight operations; Ludwig Felber, apprentice elevatorman; Walter Banholzer, engine mechanic; Willy Speck, chief radio operator.) three passengers, (Note: Erich Knocher, Irene Doehner, and Otto Ernst.) and Allen Hagaman died in the following hours or days, mostly as a result of the burns.

The majority of the crewmen who died were up inside the ship's hull, where they either did not have a clear escape route or were close to the bow of the ship, which hung burning in the air for too long for most of them to escape death. Most of the crew in the bow died in the fire, although at least one was filmed falling from the bow to his death. Most of the passengers who died were trapped in the starboard side of the passenger deck. Not only was the wind blowing the fire toward the starboard side, but the ship also rolled slightly to starboard as it settled to the ground, with much of the upper hull on that part of the ship collapsing outboard of the starboard observation windows, thus cutting off the escape of many of the passengers on that side. (Note: This is corroborated by the official testimonies and later recollections of several passenger survivors from the starboard passenger deck, including Nelson Morris, Leonhard Adelt and his wife Gertrud, Hans-Hugo Witt, Rolf von Heidenstam, and George Hirschfeld.) The sliding door leading from the starboard passenger area to the central foyer and the gangway stairs (through which rescuers led a number of passengers to safety) jammed shut during the crash, further trapping those passengers on the starboard side. (Note: Board of Inquiry testimony of Hans-Hugo Witt, a Luftwaffe military observer traveling as a passenger.) Nonetheless, some did manage to escape from the starboard passenger decks. By contrast, all but a few of the passengers on the port side of the ship survived the fire, with some of them escaping virtually unscathed. Although the best-remembered airship disaster, it was not the worst. Just over twice as many (73 of 76 on board) had perished when the helium-filled U.S. Navy scout airship USS Akron crashed at sea off the New Jersey coast four years earlier on April 4, 1933.

Werner Franz, the 14-year-old cabin boy, was initially dazed on realizing the ship was on fire but when a water tank above him burst open, putting out the fire around him, he was spurred to action. He made his way to a nearby hatch and dropped through it just as the forward part of the ship was briefly rebounding into the air. He began to run toward the starboard side, but stopped and turned around and ran the other way because wind was pushing the flames in that direction. He escaped without injury and was the last surviving crew member when he died in 2014. The last survivor, Werner G. Doehner, died November 8, 2019. At the time of the disaster, Doehner was eight years old and vacationing with family. He recalled later that his mother threw him and his brother out of the ship and jumped after them; they survived but Doehner's father and sister were killed.

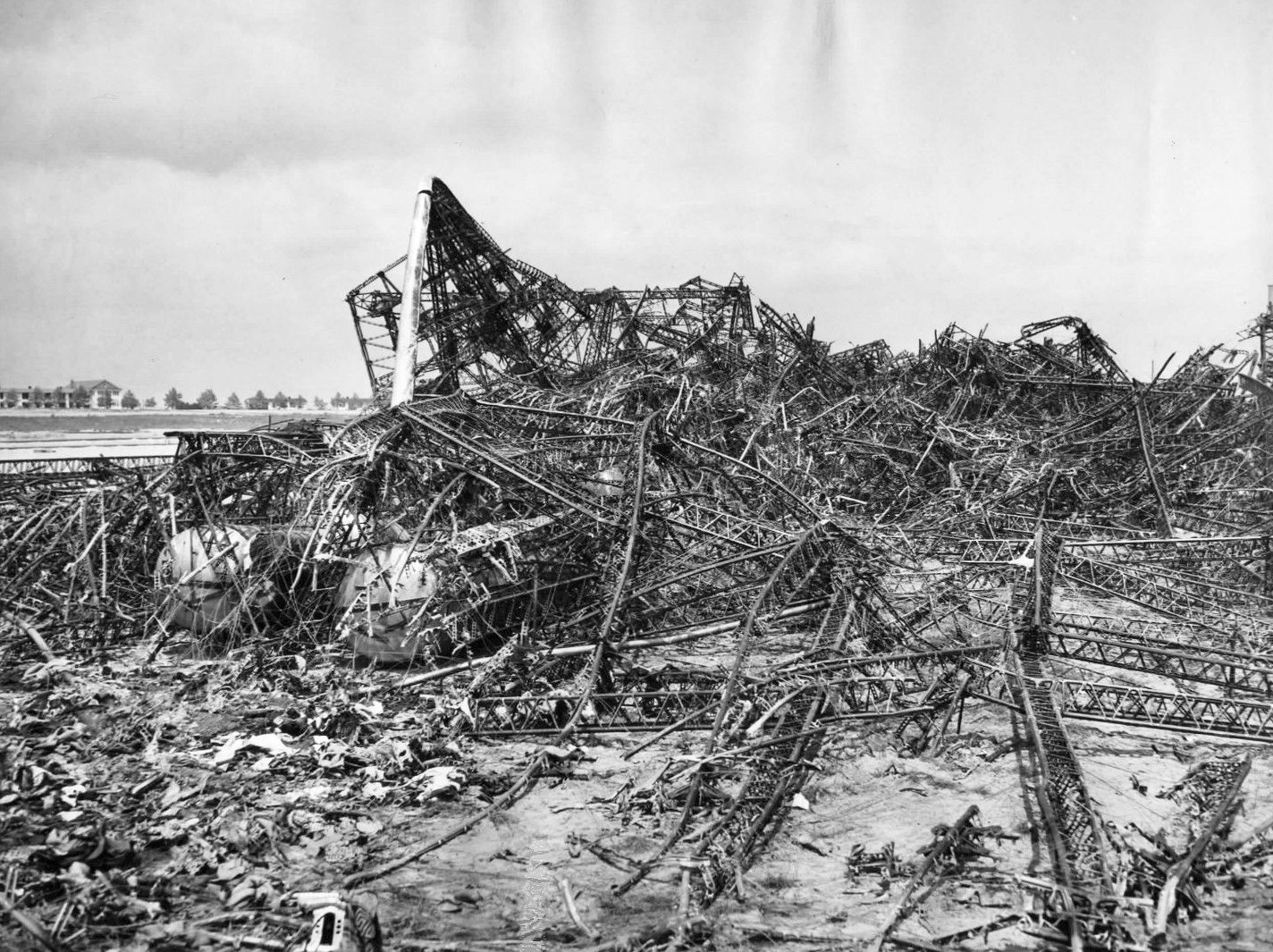
Closeup of the wreckage after a few weeks

When the control car crashed onto the ground, most of the officers leapt through the windows, but became separated. First Officer Captain Albert Sammt found Captain Max Pruss trying to re-enter the wreckage to look for survivors. Pruss's face was badly burned, and he required months of hospitalization and reconstructive surgery, but he survived.

Captain Ernst Lehmann escaped the crash with burns to his head and arms and severe burns across most of his back. He died at a nearby hospital the next day.

When passenger Joseph Späh, a vaudeville comic acrobat billed as Ben Dova, saw the first sign of trouble he smashed the window with his movie camera with which he had been filming the landing (the film survived the disaster). As the ship neared the ground he lowered himself out the window and hung onto the window ledge, letting go when the ship was perhaps 20 feet (6.1 m) above the ground. In order to safely escape, Späh kept his feet under him and attempted to do a safety roll while landing. He injured his ankle nonetheless, and was dazedly crawling away when a member of the ground crew came up, slung the diminutive Späh under one arm, and ran him clear of the fire. (Note: Subsequent on-camera interviews with Späh and his letter to the Board of Inquiry corroborate this version of his escape. One or two more dramatic versions of his escape have appeared over the years, neither of which are supported by the newsreels of the crash, one of which shows a fairly close view of the portside passenger windows as passengers and stewards begin to drop through them.)

Of the twelve crewmen in the bow of the airship, only three survived. Four of the twelve were standing on the mooring shelf, a platform up at the very tip of the bow from which the forwardmost landing ropes and the steel mooring cable were released to the ground crew, and which was directly at the forward end of the axial walkway and just ahead of gas cell #16. The rest were standing either along the lower keel walkway ahead of the control car, or else on platforms beside the stairway leading up the curve of the bow to the mooring shelf. During the fire the bow hung in the air at roughly a 45-degree angle and flames shot forward through the axial walkway, bursting through the bow (and the bow gas cells) like a blowtorch. The three men from the forward section who survived (elevatorman Kurt Bauer, cook Alfred Grözinger, and electrician Josef Leibrecht) were those furthest aft of the bow, and two of them (Bauer and Grözinger) happened to be standing near two large triangular air vents, through which cool air was being drawn by the fire. Neither of these men sustained more than superficial burns. (Note: Board of Inquiry testimonies of Kurt Bauer and Alfred Grözinger) Most of the men standing along the bow stairway either fell aft into the fire, or tried to leap from the ship when it was still too high in the air. Three of the four men standing on the mooring shelf inside the very tip of the bow were actually taken from the wreck alive, though one (Erich Spehl, a rigger) died shortly afterward in the Air Station's infirmary, and the other two (helmsman Alfred Bernhard and apprentice elevatorman Ludwig Felber) were reported by newspapers to have initially survived the fire, and then to subsequently have died at area hospitals during the night or early the following morning.

Hydrogen fires are less destructive to immediate surroundings than gasoline explosions because of the buoyancy of diatomic hydrogen, which causes the heat of combustion to be released upward more than circumferentially as the leaked mass ascends in the atmosphere; hydrogen fires are more survivable than fires of gasoline or wood. The hydrogen in the Hindenburg burned out within about ninety seconds.

== Cause of ignition ==
=== Sabotage hypothesis ===
At the time of the disaster, sabotage was commonly put forward as the cause of the fire, initially by Hugo Eckener, former head of the Zeppelin Company and the "old man" of German airships. In initial reports, before inspecting the accident, Eckener mentioned the possibility of a shot as the cause of the disaster, because of threatening letters that had been received, but did not rule out other causes. Eckener later publicly endorsed the static spark hypothesis, including after the war. At the time on a lecture tour in Austria, he was awakened at about 2:30 in the morning (8:30 p.m. Lakehurst time, or approximately an hour after the crash) by the ringing of his bedside telephone. It was a Berlin representative of The New York Times with news that the Hindenburg "exploded yesterday evening at 7 p.m. [sic] above the airfield at Lakehurst". By the time he left the hotel the next morning to travel to Berlin for a briefing on the disaster, the only answer that he had for the reporters waiting outside to question him was that based on what he knew, the Hindenburg had "exploded over the airfield"; sabotage might be a possibility. However, as he learned more about the disaster, particularly that the airship had burned rather than actually "exploded", he grew more and more convinced that static discharge, rather than sabotage, was the cause.

Charles Rosendahl, commander of the Naval Air Station at Lakehurst and the man in overall charge of the ground-based portion of the Hindenburg's landing maneuver, came to believe that the Hindenburg had been sabotaged. He laid out a general case for sabotage in his book What About the Airship? (1938), which was as much an extended argument for the further development of the rigid airship as it was a historical overview of the airship concept.

Another proponent of the sabotage hypothesis was Max Pruss, captain of the Hindenburg throughout the airship's career. Pruss flew on nearly every flight of the Graf Zeppelin since 1928 until the Hindenburg was launched in 1936. In a 1960 interview conducted by Kenneth Leish for Columbia University's Oral History Research Office, Pruss said early dirigible travel was safe, and therefore he strongly believed that sabotage was to blame. He stated that on trips to South America, which was a popular destination for German tourists, both airships passed through thunderstorms and were struck by lightning but remained unharmed.

Most members of the crew refused to believe that one of them would commit an act of sabotage, insisting only a passenger could have destroyed the airship. A suspect favored by Commander Rosendahl, Captain Pruss, and others among the Hindenburg's crew, was passenger Joseph Späh, a German acrobat who survived the fire. He brought with him a dog, a German shepherd named Ulla, as a surprise for his children. He reportedly made a number of unaccompanied visits to feed his dog, who was being kept in a freight room near the stern of the ship. Those who suspected Späh based their suspicions primarily on those trips into the ship's interior to feed his dog, that according to some of the stewards Späh had told anti-Nazi jokes during the flight, recollections by stewards that Späh had seemed agitated by the repeated delays in landing, and that he was an acrobat who could conceivably climb into the airship's rigging to plant a bomb.

In 1962, A. A. Hoehling published Who Destroyed the Hindenburg?, in which he rejected all theories but sabotage, and named a crew member as the suspect. Erich Spehl, a rigger on the Hindenburg who died of burns in the Infirmary, was named as a potential saboteur. Ten years later, Michael MacDonald Mooney's book The Hindenburg, which was based heavily on Hoehling's sabotage hypothesis, also identified Spehl as a possible saboteur; Mooney's book was made into the film The Hindenburg (1975), a mostly fictionalized account of the Zeppelin's final flight. The producers of the film were sued by Hoehling for plagiarism, but Hoehling's case was dismissed because he had presented his sabotage hypothesis as historical fact, and it is not possible to claim ownership of supposed historical facts.

It has also been suggested that Adolf Hitler himself ordered the Hindenburg to be destroyed in retaliation for Eckener's anti-Nazi opinions.

Since the publication of Hoehling's book, most airship historians, including Douglas Robinson, have dismissed Hoehling's sabotage hypothesis because no solid evidence was ever presented to support it. No pieces of a bomb were ever discovered (and there is no evidence in existing documentation that the sample collected from the wreckage, and determined to be residue from a dry cell battery, was found anywhere near the stern of the airship), and on closer examination, the evidence against Spehl and his girlfriend turned out to be rather weak. Additionally, it is unlikely that Rigger Knorr would not remain at cell 4 to further assess the purported damage claimed by Kubis. In an interview with the TV show Secrets & Mysteries, Hoehling himself asserted it was only his theory and also suggested a short circuit could be another potential cause of the fire. Additionally, Mooney's book has been criticized as having numerous fictional elements and factual errors, and it has been suggested that the plot was created for the then-upcoming 1975 film. Although Mooney alleges that three Luftwaffe officers were aboard to investigate a potential bomb threat, there is no evidence they were on board to do so, and military observers were present on previous flights to study navigational techniques and weather forecasting practices of the airship crew.

However, opponents of the sabotage hypothesis argued that only speculation supported sabotage as a cause of the fire, and no credible evidence of sabotage was produced at any of the formal hearings. Erich Spehl died in the fire and was therefore unable to refute the accusations that surfaced a quarter of a century later. The FBI investigated Joseph Späh and reported finding no evidence of Späh having any connection to a sabotage plot. According to his wife, Evelyn, Späh was upset and shocked over the accusations.

Neither the German nor the American investigation endorsed any of the sabotage theories. Proponents of the sabotage hypothesis argue that any finding of sabotage would have been an embarrassment for the Nazi regime, and they speculate that such a finding by the German investigation was suppressed for political reasons. However, it has also been suggested that numerous crewmen subscribed to the sabotage hypothesis because they refused to accept any flaws with the airship or pilot error.

Sensational newspapers claimed that a Luger pistol with one round fired was found among the wreckage and speculated that a person on board committed suicide or shot the airship. However, there is no evidence suggesting an attempted suicide or official report confirming the presence of a Luger pistol. Initially, before inspecting the scene himself, Eckener mentioned the possibility for a shot as the cause of the disaster, because of threatening letters they received. At the German enquiry Eckener discounted a shot – among many possibilities – as the cause as nearly impossible and highly improbable.

=== Static electricity hypothesis ===
Hugo Eckener argued that the fire was started by an electric spark which was caused by a buildup of static electricity on the airship. The spark ignited hydrogen on the outer skin.

Proponents of the static spark hypothesis say that the airship's skin was not constructed in a way that allowed its charge to be distributed evenly throughout the craft. The skin was separated from the duralumin frame by non-conductive ramie cords which had been lightly covered in metal to improve conductivity but not very effectively, allowing a large difference in potential to form between the skin and the frame.

In order to make up for the delay of more than 12 hours in its transatlantic flight, the Hindenburg passed through a weather front of high humidity and high electrical charge. Although the mooring lines were not wet when they first hit the ground and ignition took place four minutes after, Eckener theorised that they may have become wet in these four minutes. When the ropes, which were connected to the frame, became wet, they would have grounded the frame but not the skin. This would have caused a sudden potential difference between skin and frame (and the airship itself with the overlying air masses) and would have set off an electrical discharge – a spark. Seeking the quickest way to ground, the spark would have jumped from the skin onto the metal framework, igniting the leaking hydrogen.

In his book LZ-129 Hindenburg (1964), Zeppelin historian Douglas Robinson commented that although ignition of free hydrogen by static discharge had become a favored hypothesis, no such discharge was seen by any of the witnesses who testified at the official investigation into the accident in 1937. He continues:

But within the past year, I have located an observer, Professor Mark Heald of Princeton, New Jersey, who undoubtedly saw St. Elmo's Fire flickering along the airship's back a good minute before the fire broke out. Standing outside the main gate to the Naval Air Station, he watched, together with his wife and son, as the Zeppelin approached the mast and dropped her bow lines. A minute thereafter, by Mr. Heald's estimation, he first noticed a dim "blue flame" flickering along the backbone girder about one-quarter the length abaft the bow to the tail. There was time for him to remark to his wife, "Oh, heavens, the thing is afire," for her to reply, "Where?" and for him to answer, "Up along the top ridge" – before there was a big burst of flaming hydrogen from a point he estimated to be about one-third the ship's length from the stern.

Unlike other witnesses to the fire whose view of the port side of the ship had the light of the setting sun behind the ship, Professor Heald's view of the starboard side of the ship against a backdrop of the darkening eastern sky would have made the dim blue light of a static discharge on the top of the ship more easily visible.

Harold G. Dick was Goodyear Zeppelin's representative with Luftschiffbau Zeppelin during the mid-1930s. He flew on test flights of the Hindenburg and its sister ship, the Graf Zeppelin II. He also flew on numerous flights in the original Graf Zeppelin and ten round-trip crossings of the north and south Atlantic in the Hindenburg. In his book The Golden Age of the Great Passenger Airships Graf Zeppelin & Hindenburg, he observes:

There are two items not in common knowledge. When the outer cover of the LZ 130 [the Graf Zeppelin II] was to be applied, the lacing cord was prestretched and run through dope as before but the dope for the LZ 130 contained graphite to make it conductive. This would hardly have been necessary if the static discharge hypothesis were mere cover-up. The use of graphite dope was not publicized and I doubt if its use was widely known at the Luftschiffbau Zeppelin.

In addition to Dick's observations, during the Graf Zeppelin II's early test flights, measurements were taken of the airship's static charge. Ludwig Durr and the other engineers at Luftschiffbau Zeppelin took the static discharge hypothesis seriously and considered the insulation of the fabric from the frame to be a design flaw in the Hindenburg. Thus, the German Inquiry concluded that the insulation of the outer covering caused a spark to jump onto a nearby piece of metal, thereby igniting the hydrogen. In lab experiments, using the Hindenburg's outer covering and a static ignition, hydrogen was able to be ignited but with the covering of the LZ 127 Graf Zeppelin, nothing happened. These findings were not well-publicized and were covered up, perhaps to avoid embarrassment of such an engineering flaw in the face of the Third Reich.

A variant of the static spark hypothesis, presented by Addison Bain, is that a spark between inadequately grounded fabric cover segments of the Hindenburg itself started the fire, and that the doping compound of the outer skin was flammable enough to be ignited before hydrogen contributed to the fire. The Hindenburg had a cotton skin covered with a finish known as "dope". It is a common term for a plasticised lacquer that provides stiffness, protection, and a lightweight, airtight seal to woven fabrics. In its liquid forms, dope is highly flammable, but the flammability of dry dope depends upon its base constituents, with, for example, butyrate dope being far less flammable than cellulose nitrate. Proponents of this hypothesis claim that when the mooring line touched the ground, a resulting spark could have ignited the dope in the skin. However, the validity of this theory has been contested (see Incendiary paint hypothesis section below).

An episode of the Discovery Channel series Curiosity titled "What Destroyed the Hindenburg?," which first aired in December 2012, investigated both the static spark theory and St. Elmo's Fire, as well as sabotage by bomb. The team, led by British aeronautical engineer Jem Stansfield and US airship historian Dan Grossman, concluded that the ignition took place above the hydrogen vent just forward of where Mark Heald saw St. Elmo's Fire, and that the ignited hydrogen was channelled down the vent where it created a more explosive detonation described by crew member Helmut Lau.

An episode of the PBS series Nova titled Hindenburg: The New Evidence, which first aired in April 2021 on SBS in Australia, focuses on the static electricity hypothesis. It confirms that the Hindenburg's fabric outer skin and metal airframe were, by design, electrically isolated from each other (via air gaps between skin and frame), and finds that although this may have been done with safety in mind, it likely put the airship at greater risk for the type of accident that occurred. It also finds that there likely was a leak of hydrogen gas at the Hindenburg's stern, as evidenced by the difficulty the crew had in bringing the airship in trim prior to the landing (its aft was too low).

The episode also features laboratory experiments, conducted by Konstantinos Giapis of Caltech, designed to explain how the fatal spark occurred. Through them, Dr. Giapis demonstrates the effects of rainy weather on representations of the airship's skin, airframe and a landing rope — and successfully generates sparks between skin and frame. As Giapis notes, when its landing ropes were cast to the ground, the Hindenburg had a significant electrical charge (many thousands of volts with respect to ground) — due to its altitude, about 300 feet (91 m), and to stormy weather conditions. Although these ropes, made of Manila hemp, would have become more electrically conductive as they absorbed falling rain, Giapis finds the ropes would have conducted electricity even when dry, effectively grounding the airship the instant they touched earth. But even as the voltage of the airship's frame dropped, the voltage at its outer skin would have remained largely unchanged, due to its isolation from the rest of the airship. Thus, the voltage difference between frame and skin would have grown dramatically, greatly increasing the risk of a spark. Yet, significantly, the fire didn't erupt until four minutes later, raising the question of what could account for such a delay.

From his experiments, Dr. Giapis theorizes in the episode that during the landing, the Hindenburg behaved like a capacitor — actually an array of them — in an electrical circuit. (In his analogy, one of the two conductive plates of each "capacitor" is represented by a panel of the airship's charged outer skin, the other plate by the grounded portion of the airship.) Further, Giapis finds that the Cellon dope painted on the fabric skin acted like a capacitor's dielectric, increasing the skin's ability to hold charge beyond what it held before the airship became grounded — which he says would explain the delay in spark formation. Once the ropes dropped, charge would continue building on the skin and, according to his calculations, the additional time required to produce a spark would be slightly under four minutes, in close agreement with the investigation report. Giapis believes that there were likely many sparks occurring on the airship at the time of the accident, and that it was one near the hydrogen leak that triggered the fire. Additionally, he demonstrates experimentally that rain was a necessary component of the Hindenburg disaster, showing that the airship's skin would not have conducted electricity when dry, but that adding water to the skin increases its conductivity, allowing electric charge to flow through it, setting off sparks across gaps between skin and frame.

=== Lightning hypothesis ===
A. J. Dessler, former director of the Space Science Laboratory at NASA's Marshall Space Flight Center and a critic of the incendiary paint hypothesis favored a much simpler explanation for the conflagration, that being lightning. Like many other aircraft, the Hindenburg had been struck by lightning several times in its years of operation. This does not normally ignite a fire in hydrogen-filled airships due to the lack of oxygen. However, airship fires have been observed when lightning strikes the vehicle as it vents hydrogen as ballast in preparation for landing. The vented hydrogen mixes with the oxygen in the atmosphere, creating a combustible mixture. The Hindenburg was venting hydrogen at the time of the disaster. However, witnesses did not observe any lightning storms as the ship made its final approach.

=== Engine failure hypothesis ===
On the 70th anniversary of the accident, The Philadelphia Inquirer carried an article with yet another hypothesis, based on an interview of ground crew member Robert Buchanan. He had been a young man on the crew manning the mooring lines.

As the airship was approaching the mooring mast, he noted that one of the engines, thrown into reverse for a hard turn, backfired, and a shower of sparks was emitted. After being interviewed by Addison Bain, Buchanan believed that the airship's outer skin was ignited by engine sparks. Another ground crewman, Robert Shaw, saw a blue ring behind the tail fin and had also seen sparks coming out of the engine. Shaw believed that the blue ring he saw was leaking hydrogen which was ignited by the engine sparks.

Eckener rejected the idea that hydrogen could have been ignited by an engine backfire, postulating that the hydrogen could not have been ignited by any exhaust because the temperature is too low to ignite the hydrogen. The ignition temperature for hydrogen is 500 °C (932 °F), but the sparks from the exhaust only reach 250 °C (482 °F). The Zeppelin Company also carried out extensive tests and hydrogen had never ignited. Additionally, the fire was first seen at the top of the airship, not near the bottom of the hull.

=== Structural failure hypothesis ===
Although the official German investigation into the Hindenburg disaster ruled out structural failure as a contributing factor, the theory was explored in greater detail during the United States inquiry. The U.S. Board of Commerce report, published in August 1938 stated that "the possibility [that] a major structural failure in the stern of the ship caused hydrogen to be liberated by rupturing a cell and forcefully breaking an electrical lead or metal part, thus producing a spark" was considered plausible. The report also noted that several witnesses reported hearing a cracking sound from the stern of the ship at or around the time the fire was first observed.

Lieutenant Benjamin May, Assistant Mooring Officer in the U.S. Navy, was stationed atop the 75-foot mooring mast at the Lakehurst Naval Air Station during the landing. He testified that the port flank of the Hindenburg appeared to "collapse outwardly" before any flames were visible. He also reported hearing a sound resembling the cracking of metal shortly before the structure gave way. According to his statement, “the flank was virtually shot out at the area of the outburst and flames seemed to follow this eruption of structure.” This event was followed by a muffled explosion and the appearance of a dart-like flame approximately 30 feet in length, which emerged from both the side and top of the superstructure. The entire stern became engulfed in flames shortly thereafter.

Chief Bosun's Mate Frederick "Bull" Tobin, who was responsible for overseeing the ground crew, also noticed a burst of smoke and flame accompanied by a cracking sound. He reported that it was quite similar to the sound he remembered hearing when the USS Shenandoah cracked up in the middle in 1925, at which time he was a member of the crew. Notably, he also stated that, in his opinion, the cracking sound, which reminded him of wires and girders breaking seemed to precede the appearance of the flame.

Lieutenant Richard Antrim, also positioned on the mooring mast, reported that the fabric on the aft port side appeared "very loose and fluttering", like an untrimmed sail, extending rearward and upward from the aft-port engine to about one-quarter of the distance to the tail. Boatswain’s Mate Reginald H. Ward, who was overseeing the port bow landing party, also observed fluttering fabric on the upper port side, between frames 62 and 77. He stated that the fabric had not yet opened when first seen, but shortly thereafter a flame approximately 10 feet in diameter erupted above the area, followed by an explosion. A similar description was provided by journalist Alice Hager of the Washington Evening Star, who described the movement of the fabric as a "rippling." Taken individually, these observations may be ambiguous; collectively, however, they describe a consistent sequence of localised structural distress in the upper port stern prior to ignition.

Dr. Hugo Eckener, a veteran airship commander and member of the German commission investigating the accident, later speculated that the ship’s structural integrity may have been compromised during its final tight-turn landing maneuver. He stated that such turns imposed high stress on the aft section of the ship, especially near the stabilizing fins, which were braced with shear wires. An investigation of the wreckage provided some support for this theory. The inquiry reported that rivets connecting the aft end of the axial passageway to the hull had pulled out and that all radial wires in the frame closest to the stern had broken under tension. Although the Hindenburg had been recertified for passenger service in 1937, it had completed a full year of operations totalling around 170,000 miles, during which undetected lateral or torsional stress may have accumulated in its structure. Investigators also noted a previous incident on 12 March 1936, during which the airship's lower fin was damaged. It was suggested that small structural fractures introduced during that event may have extended beyond the repaired area.

While no photographs are known to capture the exact moment of ignition, a study published in 2025 by digital imaging historian Phil Lloyd, proposed that a photograph taken by 16-year-old amateur photographer Foo Chu may show the onset of structural failure in the aft upper hull, in the vicinity of gas cells 4 and 5. This interpretation aligns with May’s testimony regarding the location of the structural collapse. Chu took his photograph at approximately 7:20 p.m. from the visitors’ car park as the Hindenburg was commencing its landing maneuver. He then proceeded to the spectators’ entrance, capturing his next image of the airship on fire at 7:25 p.m. This could confirm that the anomaly on the Hindenburg’s hull was present for a period of time before the first flames appeared. Although photographic interpretation is inherently limited by angle, resolution and lighting conditions, the apparent depression corresponds closely with the area identified independently by eyewitness testimony. The scenario proposed by the U.S. inquiry that a structural failure within the Hindenburg's framework may have resulted in a localised collapse onto a gas cell, causing its rupture and the subsequent release of a significant volume of hydrogen is plausible. If that were the case, electrical arcing from severed wiring or friction-induced sparking would have been the most likely source of ignition.

A comparison of Foo Chu’s photograph with one taken by Arthur Cofod Jr. appears to support this interpretation. Cofod’s earlier image shows no abnormalities, while Chu’s shows a pronounced depression extending from the leading edge of the port horizontal fin across gas cells 4 and 5 and up to the top of the hull – corresponding with the location where fluttering fabric and flames were first observed. The fabric in the photograph appears stretched and distorted, suggesting the underlying frame may have bowed inward. Loosened fabric in this area may have been affected by an 8-knot crosswind which was pushing the Hindenburg westward at this time, possibly explaining the wave-like rippling motion observed by Antrim, Ward and Hager. Gusting winds of up to 20 knots at the airship's altitude may have added further stress to already compromised structural elements.

The possibility that the disaster was caused by a structural failure in the upper stern, potentially due to overstressing or metal fatigue in the airframe, remains under consideration by some researchers. Structural failure had been a contributing factor in the crash of at least 7 dirigibles including the British R.101 and the USS Macon, a U.S. Navy rigid airship lost off the coast of California in February 1935.

Despite this, both the German and U.S. investigations ultimately concluded that the most likely cause was the ignition of leaking hydrogen by static electricity. However, this theory relied on the occurrence of two events – hydrogen leakage and the presence of an ignition source – for which no direct evidence was found. Commander Charles Rosendahl later remarked in A. A. Hoehling's 1962 book Who Destroyed the Hindenburg? that “there was no direct or conclusive evidence of the existence of this combination,” and described the hypothesis as relying on "the coincidence of two remote probabilities in an unlikely occurrence."

In a 1960 interview for Hoehling's book, Captain Max Pruss, who commanded the Hindenburg during its final flight, stated that onboard instruments indicated no loss of quantity from any of the gas cells. Additionally, Watch Officer Captain Heinrich Bauer added that the ballast release observed during the approach was a standard maneuver, used to compensate for reduced airflow over the tail surfaces and increased loading after the airship passed through heavy rain approximately 30 minutes prior. He described it as “the final adjustments to this huge but sensitive set of floating scales.” Bauer also noted that no abnormal conditions were present during the four minutes between the dropping of the trail ropes and the outbreak of the fire – a claim supported by photographic evidence showing the ship in trim during that period. He added that any reported gas leak would have resulted in the cancellation of the return flight with the airship being grounded at Lakehurst for inspection.

== Fire's initial fuel ==
Most current analyses of the fire assume ignition due to some form of electricity as the cause. However, there is still much controversy over whether the fabric skin of the airship, or the hydrogen used for buoyancy, was the initial fuel for the resulting fire.

=== Static spark hypothesis ===
The theory that hydrogen was ignited by a static spark is the most widely accepted theory as determined by the official crash investigations. Offering support for the hypothesis that there was some sort of hydrogen leak prior to the fire is that the airship remained stern-heavy before landing, despite efforts to put the airship back in trim. This could have been caused by a leak of the gas, which started mixing with air, potentially creating a form of oxyhydrogen and filling up the space between the skin and the cells. A ground crew member, R.H. Ward, reported seeing the fabric cover of the upper port side of the airship fluttering, "as if gas was rising and escaping" from the cell. He said that the fire began there, but that no other disturbance occurred at the time when the fabric fluttered. Another man on the top of the mooring mast had also reported seeing a flutter in the fabric as well. Pictures that show the fire burning along straight lines that coincide with the boundaries of gas cells suggest that the fire was not burning along the skin, which was continuous. Crew members stationed in the stern reported actually seeing the cells burning.

Two main theories have been postulated as to how gas could have leaked. Eckener believed a snapped bracing wire had torn a gas cell open (see below), while others suggest that a maneuvering or automatic gas valve was stuck open and gas from cell 4 leaked through. During the airship's first flight to Rio, a gas cell was nearly emptied when an automatic valve was stuck open, and gas had to be transferred from other cells to maintain an even keel. However, no other valve failures were reported during the ship's flight history, and on the final approach there was no indication in instruments that a valve had stuck open.

Although some opponents of this theory claim that the hydrogen was odorized with garlic, it would have been detectable only in the area of a leak. Once the fire was underway, more powerful odors would have masked any garlic scent. No reports of anyone smelling garlic during the flight surfaced and no official documents have been found to prove that the hydrogen was even odorized.

Opponents of this hypothesis note that the fire was reported as burning bright red, while pure hydrogen burns blue if it is visible at all, although many other materials were consumed by the fire which could have changed its hue.

Some of the airshipmen at the time, including Captain Pruss, asserted that the stern heaviness was normal, since aerodynamic pressure would push rainwater toward the stern of the airship. The stern heaviness was also noticed minutes before the airship made its sharp turns for its approach (ruling out the snapped wire theory as the cause of the stern heaviness), and some crew members stated that it was corrected as the ship stopped (after sending six men into the bow section of the ship). Additionally, the gas cells of the ship were not pressurized, and a leak would not cause the fluttering of the outer cover, which was not seen until seconds before the fire. However, reports of the amount of rain the ship had collected have been inconsistent.

Several witnesses testified that there was no rain as the ship approached until a light rain fell minutes before the fire, while several crew members stated that before the approach the ship did encounter heavy rain. Albert Sammt, the ship's first officer who oversaw the measures to correct the stern-heaviness, initially attributed to fuel consumption and sending crewmen to their landing stations in the stern, though years later, he would assert that a leak of hydrogen had occurred. On its final approach the rainwater may have evaporated and may not completely account for the observed stern-heaviness, as the airship should have been in good trim ten minutes after passing through rain. Eckener noted that the stern heaviness was significant enough that 70,000 kilogram-meter (506,391 foot-pounds) of trimming was needed.

=== Incendiary paint hypothesis ===
The incendiary paint theory (IPT) was proposed in 1996 by retired NASA scientist Addison Bain, stating that the doping compound of the airship was the cause of the fire, and that the Hindenburg would have burned even if it were filled with helium. The hypothesis is limited to the source of ignition and to the flame front propagation, not to the source of most of the burning material, as once the fire started and spread the hydrogen clearly must have burned (although some proponents of the incendiary paint theory claim that hydrogen burned much later in the fire or that it otherwise did not contribute to the rapid spread of the fire). The incendiary paint hypothesis asserts that the major component in starting the fire and feeding its spread was the canvas skin because of the compound used on it.

Proponents of this hypothesis argue that the coatings on the fabric contained both iron oxide and aluminum-impregnated cellulose acetate butyrate (CAB) which remain potentially reactive even after fully setting. Iron oxide and aluminum can be used as components of solid rocket fuel or thermite. For example, the propellant for the Space Shuttle solid rocket booster included both "aluminum (fuel, 16%), (and) iron oxide (a catalyst, 0.4%)". The coating applied to the Hindenburg's covering did not have a sufficient quantity of any material capable of acting as an oxidizer, which is a necessary component of rocket fuel, but oxygen is also available from the air.

Bain received permission from the German government to search their archives and discovered evidence that, during the Nazi regime, German scientists concluded the dope on the Hindenburg's fabric skin was the cause of the conflagration. Bain interviewed the wife of the investigation's lead scientist Max Dieckmann, and she stated that her husband had told her about the conclusion and instructed her to tell no one, presumably because it would have embarrassed the Nazi government. Additionally, Dieckmann concluded that it was the poor conductivity, not the flammability of the doping compound, that led to the ignition of hydrogen.

However, Otto Beyersdorff, an independent investigator hired by the Zeppelin Company, asserted that the outer skin itself was flammable. In several television shows, Bain attempted to prove the flammability of the fabric by igniting it with either an open flame or a Jacob's Ladder machine. Although Bain's fabric ignited, critics argue that Bain had to correctly position the fabric parallel to a machine with a continuous electric current inconsistent with atmospheric conditions. In response to this criticism, the IPT therefore postulates that a spark would need to be parallel to the surface, and that "panel-to-panel arcing" occurs where the spark moves between panels of paint isolated from each other. Astrophysicist Alexander J. Dessler points out a static spark does not have sufficient energy to ignite the doping compound, and that the insulating properties of the doping compound prevents a parallel spark path through it. Additionally, Dessler contends that the skin would also be electrically conductive in the wet and damp conditions before the fire.

Critics also argue that port side witnesses on the field, as well as crew members stationed in the stern, saw a glow inside Cell 4 before any fire broke out of the skin, indicating that the fire began inside the airship or that after the hydrogen ignited, the invisible fire fed on the gas cell material. Newsreel footage clearly shows that the fire was burning inside the structure.

Proponents of the paint hypothesis claim that the glow is actually the fire igniting on the starboard side, as seen by some other witnesses. From two eyewitness statements, Bain asserts the fire began near cell 1 behind the tail fins and spread forward before it was seen by witnesses on the port side. However, photographs of the early stages of the fire show the gas cells of the Hindenburg's entire aft section fully aflame, and no glow is seen through the areas where the fabric is still intact. Burning gas spewing upward from the top of the airship was causing low pressure inside, allowing atmospheric pressure to press the skin inward.

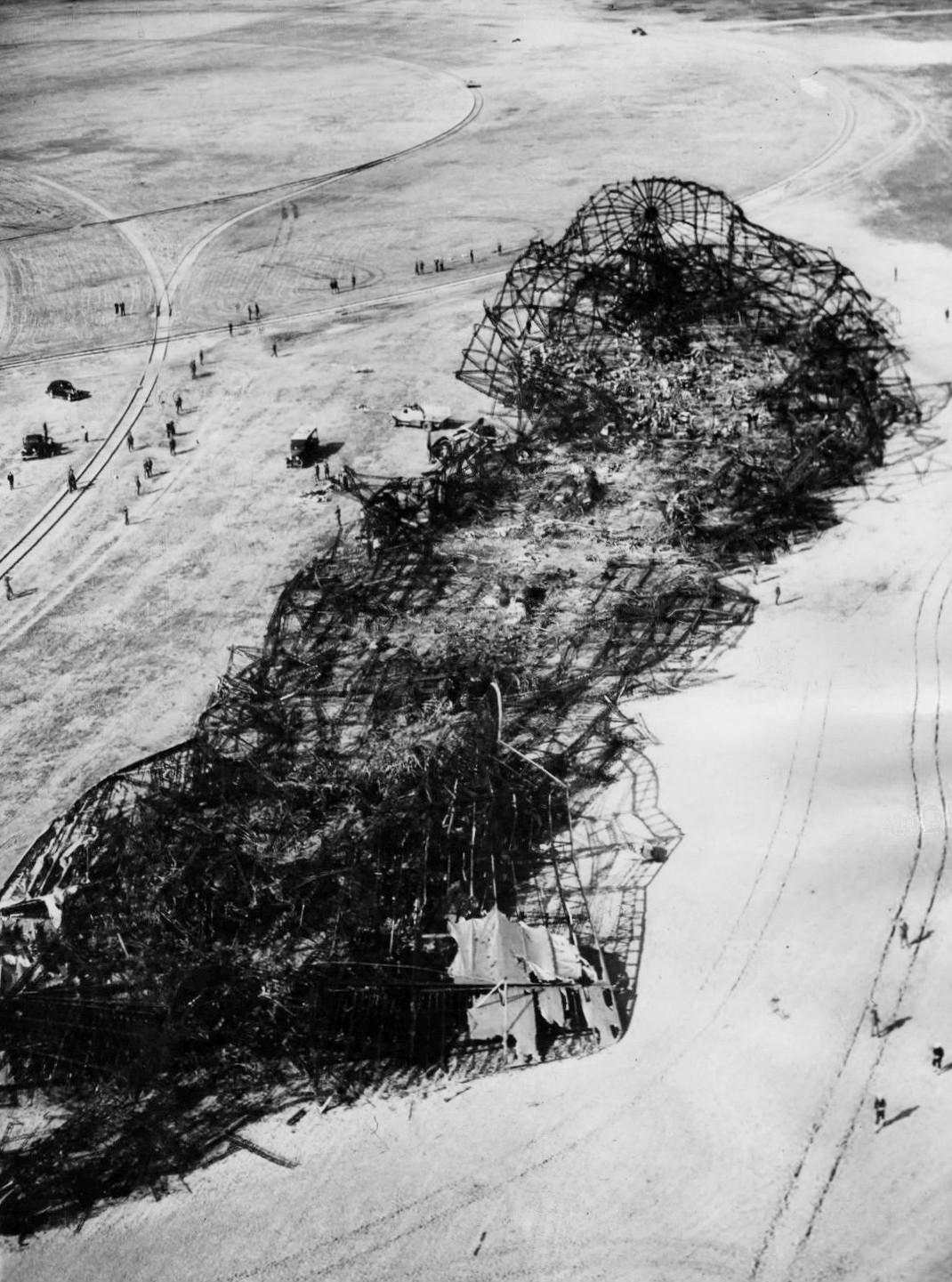
The wreckage of the Hindenburg the morning after the crash. Some fabric remains on the tail fins.

Occasionally, the Hindenburg's varnish is incorrectly identified as, or stated being similar to, cellulose nitrate which, like most nitrates, burns very readily. Instead, the cellulose acetate butyrate (CAB) used to seal the zeppelin's skin is rated by the plastics industry as combustible but nonflammable. That is, it burns if placed within a fire but is not readily ignited. Not all fabric on the Hindenburg burned. For example, the fabric on the port and starboard tail fins was not completely consumed. That the fabric not near the hydrogen fire did not burn is not consistent with the "explosive" dope hypothesis.

The TV show MythBusters explored the incendiary paint hypothesis. Their findings indicated that the aluminum and iron oxide ratios in the Hindenburg's skin, while certainly flammable, were not enough on their own to destroy the zeppelin. Had the skin contained enough metal to produce pure thermite, the Hindenburg would have been too heavy to fly. The MythBusters team also discovered that the Hindenburg's coated skin had a higher ignition temperature than that of untreated material, and that it would initially burn slowly, but that after some time the fire would begin to accelerate considerably with some indication of a thermite reaction. From this, they concluded that those arguing against the incendiary paint theory may have been wrong about the airship's skin not forming thermite due to the compounds being separated in different layers. Despite this, the skin alone would burn too slowly to account for the rapid spread of the fire, as it would have taken four times the speed for the ship to burn. The MythBusters concluded that the paint may have contributed to the disaster, but that it was not the sole reason for such rapid combustion.

=== Puncture hypothesis ===
Although Captain Pruss believed that the Hindenburg could withstand tight turns without significant damage, proponents of the puncture hypothesis, including Hugo Eckener, question the airship's structural integrity after being repeatedly stressed over its flight record.

The airship did not receive much in the way of routine inspections even though there was evidence of at least some damage on previous flights. It is not known whether that damage was properly repaired or even whether all the failures had been found. During the ship's first return flight from Rio, Hindenburg had once lost an engine and almost drifted over Africa, where it could have crashed. Afterward, Eckener ordered section chiefs to inspect the airship during flight. However, the complexity of the airship's structure would make it virtually impossible to detect all weaknesses in the structure. In March 1936, the Hindenburg and the Graf Zeppelin made three-day flights to drop leaflets and broadcast speeches via loudspeaker. Before the airship's takeoff on March 26, 1936, Ernst Lehmann chose to launch the Hindenburg with the wind blowing from behind the airship, instead of into the wind as per standard procedure. During the takeoff, the airship's tail struck the ground, and part of the lower fin was broken. Although that damage was repaired, the force of the impact may have caused internal damage. Only six days before the disaster, it was planned to make the Hindenburg have a hook on her hull to carry aircraft, similar to the US Navy's use of the USS Akron and the USS Macon airships. However, the trials were unsuccessful as the biplane hit the Hindenburg's trapeze several times. The structure of the airship may have been further affected by this incident.

Newsreels, as well as the map of the landing approach, show that the Hindenburg made several sharp turns, first toward port and then starboard, just before the accident. Proponents posit that either of these turns could have weakened the structure near the vertical fins, causing a bracing wire to snap and puncture at least one of the internal gas cells. Additionally, some of the bracing wires may have even been substandard. One bracing wire tested after the crash broke at a mere 70% of its rated load. A punctured cell would have freed hydrogen into the air and could have been ignited by a static discharge (see above), or it is also possible that the broken bracing wire struck a girder, causing sparks to ignite hydrogen. When the fire started, people on board the airship reported hearing a muffled detonation, but outside, a ground crew member on the starboard side reported hearing a crack. Some speculate the sound was from a bracing wire snapping.

Eckener concluded that the puncture hypothesis, due to pilot error, was the most likely explanation for the disaster. He held Captains Pruss and Lehmann, and Charles Rosendahl responsible for what he viewed as a rushed landing procedure with the airship badly out of trim under poor weather conditions. Pruss had made the sharp turn under Lehmann's pressure; while Rosendahl called the airship in for landing, believing the conditions were suitable. Eckener noted that a smaller storm front followed the thunderstorm front, creating conditions suitable for static sparks.

During the US inquiry, Eckener testified that he believed that the fire was caused by the ignition of hydrogen by a static spark:

The ship proceeded in a sharp turn to approach for its landing. That generates extremely high tension in the after part of the ship, and especially in the center sections close to the stabilizing fins which are braced by shear wires. I can imagine that one of these shear wires parted and caused a rent in a gas cell. If we will assume this further, then what happened subsequently can be fitted in to what observers have testified to here: Gas escaped from the torn cell upward and filled up the space between the outer cover and the cells in the rear part of the ship, and then this quantity of gas which we have assumed in the hypothesis was ignited by a static spark.

Under these conditions, naturally, the gas accumulated between the gas cells and the outer cover must have been a very rich gas. That means it was not an explosive mixture of hydrogen, but more of a pure hydrogen. The loss of gas must have been appreciable.

I would like to insert here, because the necessary trimming moments to keep the ship on an even keel were appreciable, and everything apparently happened in the last five or six minutes, that is, during the sharp turn preceding the landing maneuver, that therefore there must have been a rich gas mixture up there, or possibly pure gas, and such gas does not burn in the form of an explosion. It burns off slowly, particularly because it was in an enclosed space between outer cover and gas cells, and only in the moment when gas cells are burned by the burning off of this gas, then the gas escapes in greater volume, and then the explosions can occur, which have been reported to us at a later stage of the accident by so many witnesses.

The rest it is not necessary for me to explain, and in conclusion, I would like to state this appears to me to be a possible explanation, based on weighing all of the testimony that I have heard so far.

However, the apparent stern heaviness during the landing approach was noticed thirty minutes before the landing approach, indicating that a gas leak resulting from a sharp turn did not cause the initial stern heaviness.

=== Fuel leak ===
The 2001 documentary Hindenburg Disaster: Probable Cause suggested that 16-year-old Bobby Rutan, who claimed that he had smelled "gasoline" when he was standing below the Hindenburg's aft port engine, had detected a diesel fuel leak. During the investigation, Commander Charles Rosendahl dismissed the boy's report. The day before the disaster, a fuel pump had broken during the flight, but the chief engineer testified that the pump had been replaced. The resulting vapor of a diesel leak, in addition to the engines being overheated, would have been highly flammable and could have self-combusted.

== Rate of flame propagation ==
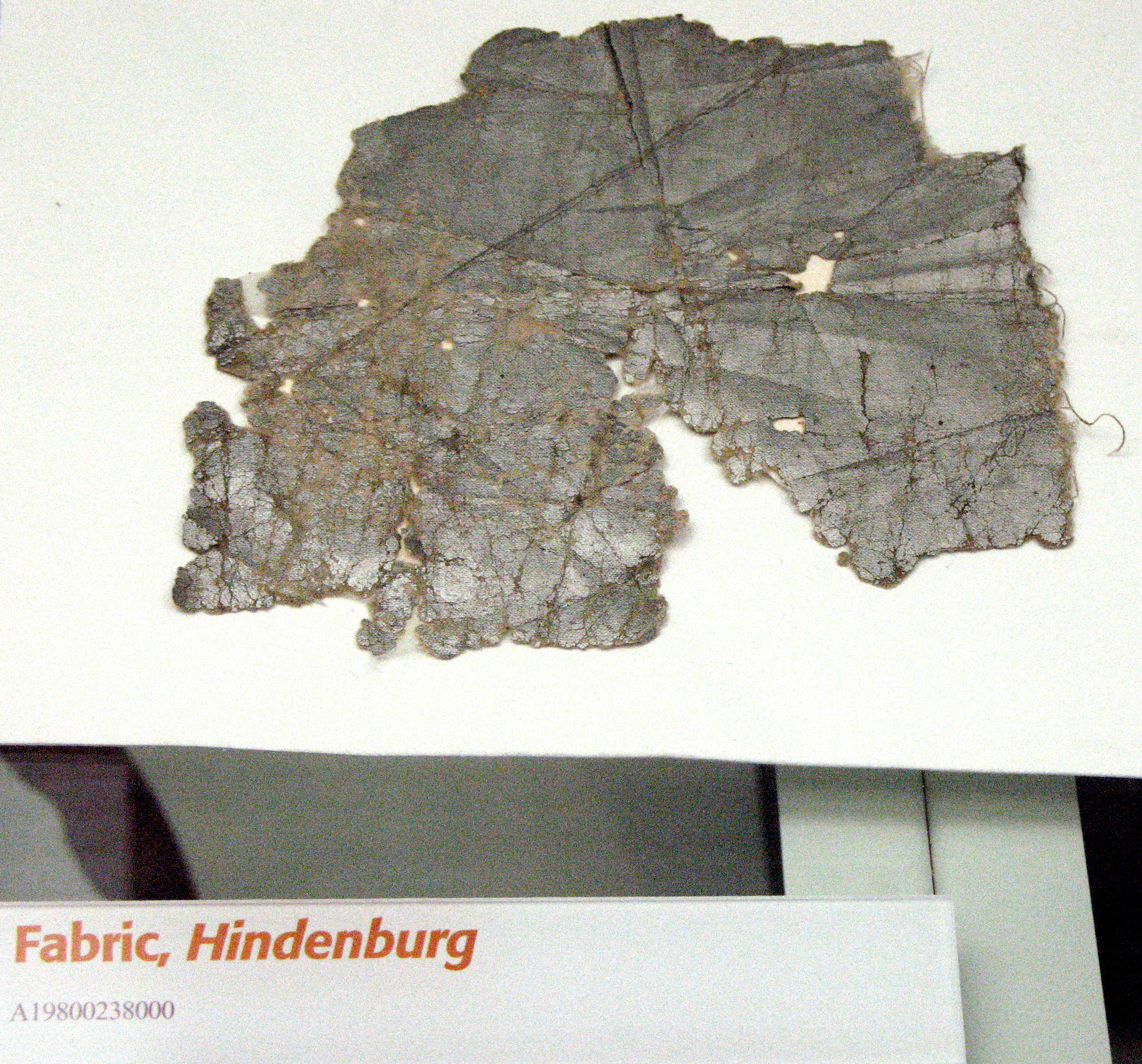
Fabric of the Hindenburg, held in the Steven F. Udvar-Hazy Center

Regardless of the source of ignition or the initial fuel for the fire, there remains the question of what caused the rapid spread of flames along the length of the airship, with debate again centered on the fabric covering of the airship and the hydrogen used for buoyancy.

Proponents of both the incendiary paint hypothesis and the hydrogen hypothesis agree that the fabric coatings were probably responsible for the rapid spread of the fire. The combustion of hydrogen is not usually visible to the human eye in daylight, because most of its radiation is not in the visible portion of the spectrum but rather ultraviolet. However, black-and-white photographic film of the era had a different light sensitivity spectrum than the human eye, and was sensitive farther out into the ultraviolet regions than the human eye. While hydrogen tends to burn invisibly, the materials around it, if combustible, would change the color of the fire.

The motion picture films show the fire spreading downward along the skin of the airship. While fires generally tend to burn upward, especially including hydrogen fires, the enormous radiant heat from the blaze would have quickly spread fire over the entire surface of the airship, thus apparently explaining the downward propagation of the flames. Falling, burning debris would also appear as downward streaks of fire.

Those skeptical of the incendiary paint hypothesis cite recent technical papers which claim that even if the airship had been coated with actual rocket fuel, it would have taken many hours to burn – not the 32 to 37 seconds that it actually took.

Modern experiments that recreated the fabric and coating materials of the Hindenburg seem to discredit the incendiary fabric hypothesis. They conclude that it would have taken about 40 hours for the Hindenburg to burn if the fire had been driven by combustible fabric. Two additional scientific papers also strongly reject the fabric hypothesis. However, the MythBusters Hindenburg special seemed to indicate that while the hydrogen was the dominant driving force the burning fabric doping was significant with differences in how each burned visible in the original footage.

The most conclusive proof against the fabric hypothesis is in the photographs of the actual accident as well as the many airships which were not doped with aluminium powder and still exploded violently. When a single gas cell explodes, it creates a shock wave and heat. The shock wave tends to rip nearby bags which then explode themselves. In the case of the Ahlhorn disaster on January 5, 1918, explosions of airships in one hangar caused the explosions of others in three adjoining hangars, wiping out all five Zeppelins at the base.

The photos of the Hindenburg disaster show that after the cells in the aft section of the airship exploded and the combustion products were vented out the top of the airship, the fabric on the rear section was still largely intact, and air pressure from the outside was acting upon it, caving the sides of the airship inward due to the reduction of pressure caused by the venting of combustion gases out the top.

The loss of lift at the rear caused the airship to nose up suddenly and the back to break in half (the airship was still in one piece), at that time the primary mode for the fire to spread was along the axial gangway which acted as a chimney, conducting fire which burst out the nose as the airship's tail touched the ground, and as seen in one of the most famous pictures of the disaster.

== Memorial ==
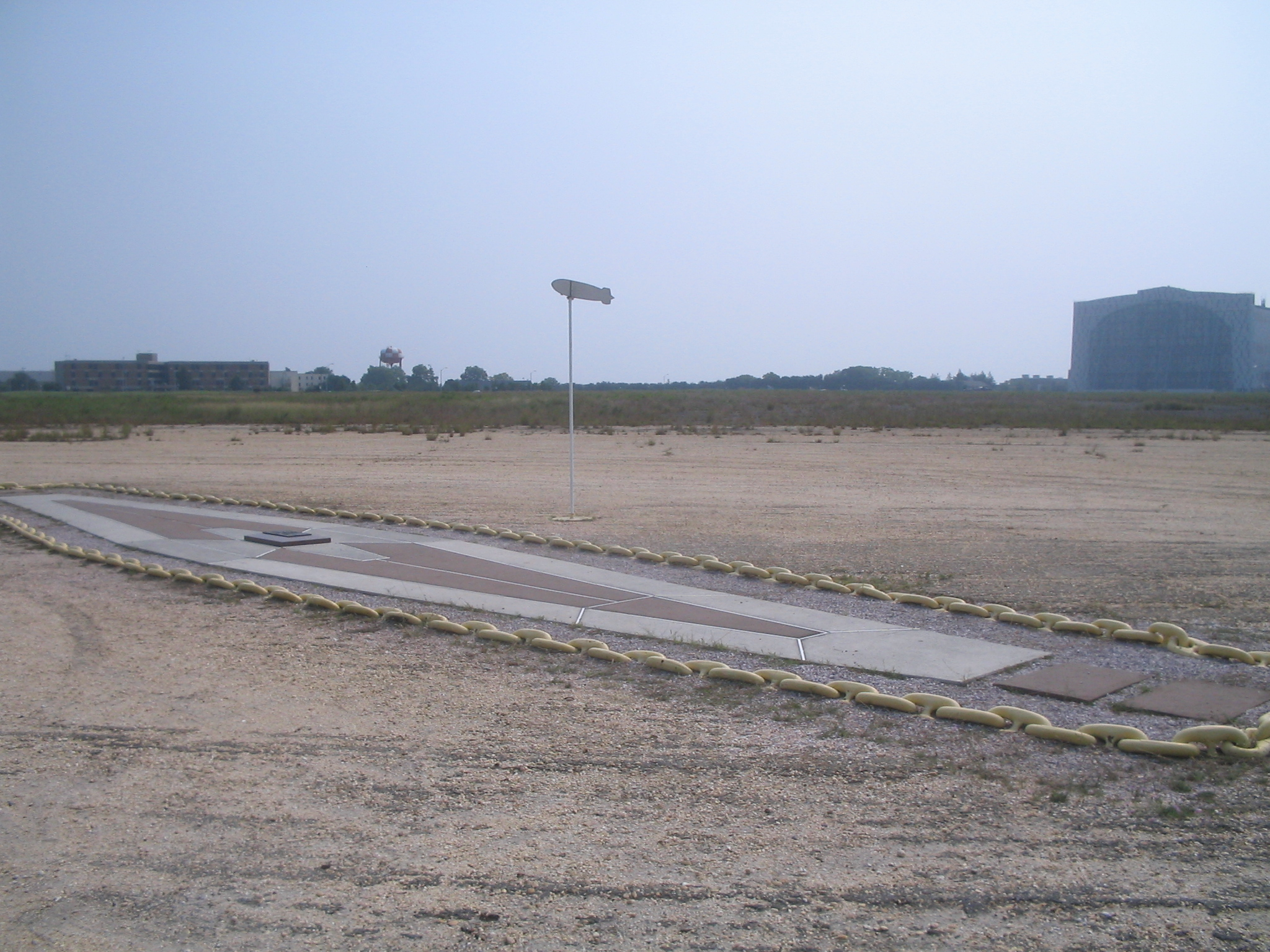
Current marker at the disaster site, shown with Hangar No. 1 in background

The site of the Hindenburg crash is at the Lakehurst Naval entity of Joint Base McGuire–Dix–Lakehurst. It is marked with a chain-outlined pad and bronze plaque where the airship's gondola landed. It was dedicated on May 6, 1987, the 50th anniversary of the disaster. Hangar No. 1, which still stands, is where the airship was to be housed after landing. It was designated a National Historic Landmark in 1968. Pre-registered tours are held through the Navy Lakehurst Historical Society.

== See also ==
- Crash cover
- Hindenburg disaster in popular culture
- Hindenburg disaster newsreel footage
- Hindenburg: The Untold Story, a docudrama aired on the 70th anniversary of the disaster, May 6, 2007
- List of photographs considered the most important
- Albert Sammt
- Timeline of hydrogen technologies
- Helium Act of 1925

== Bibliography ==
- Archbold, Rick (1994). Hindenburg: an illustrated history. New York, N.Y: Warner Books. ISBN 978-0-446-51784-3.
- Bernanke, Jaime; Bachar, Kevin (1999). Hindenburg's Fiery Secret (VHS). Washington, D.C.: National Geographic Video. OCLC 43937943.
- Birchall, Frederick (August 1, 1936). "100,000 Hail Hitler; U.S. Athletes Avoid Nazi Salute to Him". The New York Times. p. 1.
- Blackwell, Jon (2007). Notorious New Jersey: 100 true tales of murders and mobsters, scandals and scoundrels. New Brunswick, NJ: Rutgers University Press. ISBN 978-0-8135-4399-4.
- Botting, Douglas (2001). Dr. Eckener's dream machine: the great zeppelin and the dawn of air travel. New York: Henry Holt and Company. ISBN 978-0-8050-6458-2.
- Craats, Rennay (2009). Trends: USA past, present, future. New York: Weigl Publishers. ISBN 978-1-59036-976-0. OCLC 226361590.
- Deutsche Zeppelin-Reederei (1937). Airship Voyages Made Easy (16 page booklet for "Hindenburg" passengers). Friedrichshafen, Germany: Luftschiffbau Zeppelin G.m.b.H.
- Dick, Harold G.; Robinson, Douglas Hill (1985). The golden age of the great passenger airships, Graf Zeppelin & Hindenburg. Washington, D.C: Smithsonian Institution Press. ISBN 978-0-87474-364-7.
- Duggan, John (2002). LZ 129 "Hindenburg": The Complete Story. Ickenham, UK: Zeppelin Study Group. ISBN 978-0-9514-1148-3.
- Hoehling, A. A. (1962). Who destroyed the Hindenburg!. Boston: Little, Brown and Company. OCLC 1393337.
- Hoffmann, Peter; Harkin, Tom (2002). Tomorrow's energy: hydrogen, fuel cells, and the prospects for a cleaner planet. Cambridge, Mass.: The MIT Press. ISBN 978-0-262-58221-6.
- Lehmann, Ernst (1937). Adelt, Leonhard (ed.). Zeppelin, the story of lighter-than-air craft. Translated by Dratler, Jay. London: Longmans, Green and Co.
- Majoor, Mireille (2000). Inside the Hindenburg. Boston, Mass.: Little, Brown and Company. ISBN 978-0-316-12354-9.
- Mooney, Michael Macdonald (1972). The Hindenburg. New York: Bantam Books. ISBN 978-0-396-06502-9.
- Toland, John (1972). The great dirigibles; their triumphs and disasters. Boston: Dover Publications. ISBN 978-0-486-21397-2.
