= Herbert Morrison (journalist) =

American journalist (1905–1989)

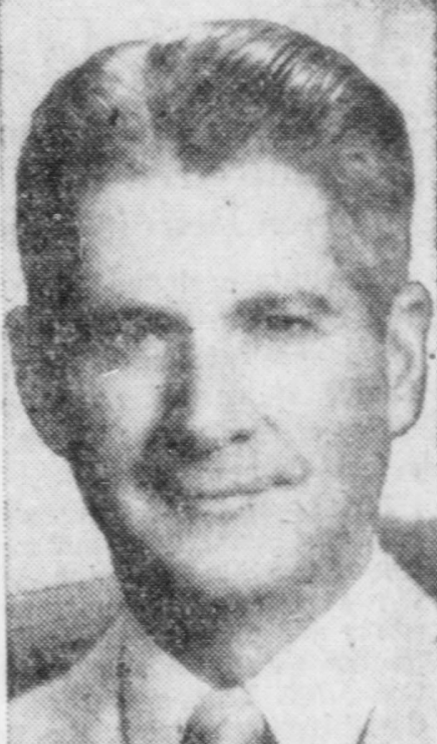
- Morrison in 1955
- Born: May 12, 1905; Scottdale, Pennsylvania, US
- Died: January 10, 1989 (aged 83); Morgantown, West Virginia, US
- Occupation: Radio and television journalist
- Spouse: Mary Jane Kelly

Herbert Morrison (May 12, 1905 – January 10, 1989) was an American journalist whose charged radio report on the Hindenburg disaster is recognized as a landmark in broadcasting. Decades on from his 1937 report, he became the first news director at Pennsylvania's television station WTAE-TV. The writer Craig M. Allen describes him as "an early pioneer of both radio and television news".

Native to Pennsylvania, Morrison joined the WLS radio station in 1936. When the airship Hindenburg was set to conclude its maiden US trip of 1937 in Lakehurst, New Jersey, he was sent there to report on its planned landing. He brought with him new, unusual recording equipment. As the airship neared the landing ground, it burst into flames, and Morrison's report turned emotional. He hyperventilated and wept, crying, "Oh, the humanity" out of grief for the lives lost, a phrase that has since been assimilated into popular culture.

Morrison's report aired on WLS the following day, and parts of it featured on NBC. NBC had never broadcast a recording before but made an exception for Morrison's firsthand account. Millions around the world eventually heard it. The broadcast is credited, in part, with drawing much attention to the Hindenburg disaster compared with other calamities of that time. An early example of emergency, as-it-happened reporting, it altered how the relationship between the radio and news is understood. Its dramatic tone influenced the production of Orson Welles' radio drama "The War of the Worlds".

Morrison's work as a journalist continued for several decades, first in New York City and then in Pittsburgh. He was also a trained pilot, serving in the Army Air Corps during World War II, and a politician based in Pennsylvania.

== Early life ==
Herbert Morrison, known as "Herb", was born on May 12, 1905, (Note: A New York Times article published on Sunday, May 5, 1985, noted that Morrison would turn 80 "next Sunday": May 12, 1985. From this information, it can be concluded that he was born on May 12, 1905.) in Scottdale, Pennsylvania. He graduated from Scottdale High in 1923. (Note: He also attended West Point but did not graduate.) Seven years after, his career in radio began at WMMN in Fairmont, West Virginia, and he later became a reporter for the Pittsburgh station KQV, Milwaukee's WTMJ, and Gary's WIND. At KQV, he covered the 1936 Pittsburgh flood. In October 1936, he moved to WLS, a Chicago radio station affiliated with NBC.

== Hindenburg disaster ==
=== Background ===
In May 1937, the airship Hindenburg was set to fly from Frankfurt to Lakehurst, New Jersey. Commissioned the year prior in Nazi Germany, it was the largest aircraft ever built at the time of completion. The Lakehurst flight—its 63rd—would mark the commencement of its 1937 season in the United States as well as the one-year anniversary of the transatlantic service's opening. Accordingly, outlets deemed it newsworthy.

Morrison was then 31 years old. Following a request from American Airlines, which thought a broadcast would produce good publicity, he flew to Lakehurst to report on the Hindenburg landing. He had petitioned WLS for permission to bring novel recording apparatus to test during the report: a Presto Direct Disc recorder along with an amplifier and a heavy-duty lathe that transcribed the report into four disks. (Note: The recording was also done "for archival purposes". Additionally, the radio historian John Dunning writes that capturing the noises of an airship mooring was thought to benefit WLS' sound effects section.) Recording was an unorthodox media practice at the time, but WLS gave its assent. "I had gone down to Lakehurst to demonstrate that a person could … cover the story without the necessity of waiting for the installation of telephone wires", Morrison later recalled. In the late 1930s, notes the media writer Tim Crook, radio journalists were being hired more and more. Morrison was the only broadcaster present at Lakehurst to cover the Hindenburg's landing; Charles Nehlsen, a WLS sound engineer, accompanied him. Upon arriving, the two settled in a shack on the edge of the landing field.

=== Morrison's commentary ===
On May 6, the Hindenburg was nearing Lakehurst, and Morrison began recording around 6:30 pm EDT. His plan was to comment on the landing, then edit the broadcast and play it back on a Saturday WLS radio program. Poor weather conditions delayed the airship's arrival by several hours. Morrison's report, at first, covered the Hindenburg's voyage, crew, and planned landing:

It's starting to rain again—the rain had slacked up a little bit. The back motors of the ship are just holding it just enough to keep it from...

At 7:21 pm EDT, it started preparing to land. Four minutes later, the Hindenburg caught fire, and it sank to the landing ground engulfed in flames. It disintegrated within a minute. 35 of the 97 people aboard and one person on the ground died. As he witnessed the disaster unfold, Morrison's tone immediately changed:

Morrison's report on the Hindenburg disaster was eventually combined with footage of the airship's collapse and disintegration.

It burst into flames! (Note: At this moment, a click is heard: the needle of the recorder was knocked off. Nehlsen quickly replaced it, and the recording continued.) Get this Charlie! (Note: "Charlie" refers to Charles Nehlsen, Morrison's sound engineer. The source writes "Charlie" as "Charley". For consistency's sake, all instances of "Charley" have been substituted for "Charlie".) Get this Charlie! It's burning and it's crashing! It's crashing terrible! Oh my, get out of the way, please! It's burning and bursting into flames and it's—and it's falling on the mooring mast, and all the folks agree that this is terrible, this is one of the worst catastrophes in the world! And oh, it's… the flames, climbing, oh, four or five hundred feet into the sky, and… It's a terrific crash, ladies and gentlemen. The smoke and it's flames now, and the frame is crashing to the ground, not quite to the mooring mast. Oh, the humanity and all the passengers screaming around here. I told you. It's—I can't even talk to people whose friends were on there. It—It's… ah! I—I can't talk, ladies and gentlemen. Honest, it's just laying there, a mass of smoking wreckage, Ah! And everybody can't hardly breathe and talk, and the screaming… Lady, I—I—I'm sorry. (Note: In Morrison's telling, he was addressing a woman awaiting the arrival of her loved ones who had fainted next to him.) Honestly, I—I can hardly breathe. I—I'm gonna step inside where I cannot see it… Charlie, that's terrible. I—I can't… I, listen folks, I—I'm gonna have to stop for a minute because I've lost my voice, this is the worst thing I've ever witnessed.

I had been talking, roughly for about eight minutes, [… and then] I was forced to change my words into ones that would describe the tragedy. As I talked, tears filled my eyes and I immediately thought 'this can't be happening, I am telling a lie, what will my mother say …' but I kept talking and describing what was happening … My great concern, as you may have learned listening to the recording … was that of the humanity, aboard.

— Morrison in 1966 on the moment the Hindenburg collapsed

Morrison lost his composure; he hyperventilated, broke into tears, and briefly lost his voice as his professional commentary gave way to an emotional outpour. However, he quickly recovered and went on to report on the disaster for 37 minutes over the next two hours:

Coming back again, I have sort of recovered from the terrific explosion and the terrific crash that occurred just before it was pulled down to the mooring mast. … They are carrying [relatives of the people aboard the airship], to give them first aid and to restore them. Some of them have fainted. The people are rushing down to the burning ship with fire extinguishers to see if they can extinguish any of the blaze. The blaze is terrific, because of the terrible amount of hydrogen gas in it.

When, during these two hours, he was not recording, he interviewed witnesses and survivors of the Hindenburg's collapse, identifying some of them by name, and partook in rescue efforts.

Dan Grossman of Airships.net remarks that "while early news reports of air crashes are infamous for their inaccuracy even today, Morrison accurately described the facts that were known". He notes that Morrison deduced the explosion to static electricity owing to the stormy weather that day, which scholars now recognize as the likeliest cause of the disaster, although it is still not fully understood. (Note: Other leading theories concern the airship's sharp turn just before landing, which may have caused a rupture near one of the hydrogen tanks or torn a steering cable, and the apparently flammable coating of its outer components and bladders. The scientist Addison Bain "theorized that the Hindenburg's much higher than normal landing descent on May 6 — coupled with the highly electrical sensitivity and flammability of its outer cover — led to the airship's demise." Grossman retorts, "One thing is clear: the disaster had nothing to do with the zeppelin's fabric covering being 'highly flammable' for one simple reason: it wasn't.") The media historians Christopher H. Sterling and Cary O'Dell offer a kindred opinion: "Listening to the entire set of recordings reveals that [Morrison] was generally calm. Despite very difficult operating conditions, his reporting was mostly clear and accurate." After the disaster, popular airship travel died out. (Note: According to some experts, popular airship travel was already headed toward extinction by the time the Hindenburg crashed. The "Hindenburg was obsolete before it ever flew", notes Grossman.)

Morrison's full report was recorded on four 16-inch disks. When he and Nehlsen finished their work, Nazi officials started following them in hopes of retrieving the disks to prevent the report from airing, fearing that it would tarnish the regime's image. They managed to flee and return to Chicago safely. News of the Hindenburg disintegrating first broke on New York's WHN station eight minutes after the event, with CBS and NBC covering it within half an hour. The next day, May 7, Morrison's full commentary aired on WLS at 12:45 pm CDT, and an excerpt was broadcast on the Red and Blue Networks; it was not heard live.

This was the first time a recording was broadcast on NBC. At the time, events were mostly either covered live or by telephone, and NBC had prohibited airing recordings in favor of live reports, which were considered more genuine and reliable. However, they made an exception for Morrison's because, as the writer Michael McCarthy explains, the Hindenburg report was an "exclusive, red-hot eyewitness account of the calamity" like no other. (Note: Two other networks broadcast Morrison's commentary, likewise breaking their policy against broadcasting recordings in doing so.) Just before NBC Blue aired parts of the report, an announcer stated: "[We] present now one of the most unique broadcasts we have ever presented." Still, their practice was upheld until World War II. The day after the broadcast, NBC interviewed Morrison on national television to discuss the disaster as he saw it unfold.

=== Aftermath and legacy ===
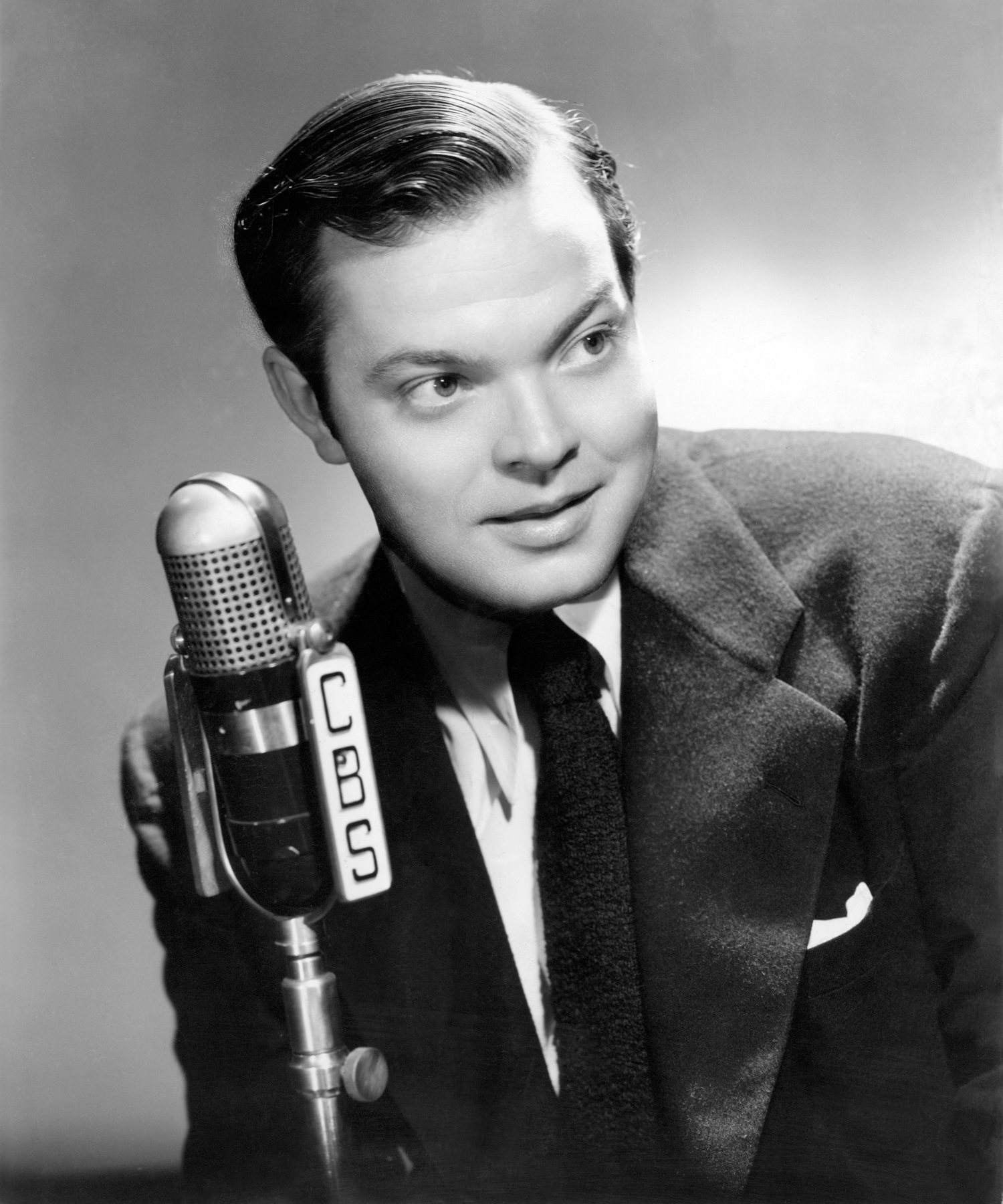
Orson Welles' radio drama "The War of the Worlds" took inspiration from Morrison's broadcast.

Morrison's report was eventually distributed worldwide and heard by millions. His dramatic, emotional reaction to the Hindenburg's collapse—his sorrow manifest—garnered the most attention and struck a chord with listeners. In McCarthy's words: "The public had never heard such a raw, shocking account of an eyewitness plunged in a blink of an eye into an unfolding catastrophe. It was spellbinding." Chicagoan radio editors applauded his commentary, with a writer for the Herald-Examiner calling it "one of the best pieces of worlds-eye view [I've] ever heard". The WLS president recognized Morrison and Charles Nehlsen's efforts.

McCarthy suggests that Morrison's reaction is the first viral audio. Moreover, "oh, the humanity", a phrase Morrison uttered out of sorrow for the disaster's victims, is now deemed a cultural and popular symbol, so much so that it has become a generic expression of horror. He later recalled having exclaimed those words under the assumption that everyone aboard the Hindenburg had died, when in fact 62 people survived. Grossman describes Morrison's report as "the public's most enduring memory of the crash", and Burt A. Folkart of the Los Angeles Times remarks that it is synonymous with the calamity.

Morrison's recording left a mark on Orson Welles' radio drama "The War of the Worlds", which aired the year after the Hindenburg disaster. He sought to style the drama as a contemporary radio broadcast. Frank Readick, who played the reporter witnessing a Martian invasion, listened to Morrison's report repeatedly, heeding his voice and outpouring of emotions to craft an effective hysterical reaction. (Note: According to Tim Crook, Welles directed Readick to study the report.)

=== Scholarly analysis ===
[At] no time was radio newscasting so immediate and so poignant as the most famous broadcast of the [1930s] — Herbert Morrison in Lakehurst, New Jersey, describing the explosion of the Hindenberg. 'Oh … the humanity …' he intoned. This was more than just newsprint on a page.

— Christopher Vaughn in The Museum of Television and Radio, 1991

The scholar Luther F. Sies highlights Morrison's broadcast as a notable event in the history of special, as-it-happened broadcasting. In fact, as notes the historian Carl Jablonski, the Hindenburg disaster was one of the first to be documented just as it happened, (Note: The radio writer John Dunning calls it "radio's first on-the-scene disaster.") with cameras and recording apparatus present onsite to capture it in real time. This was not the case with many previous disasters, such as the deadlier crash of the USS Akron. While these calamities, of which no footage or recording exist, remained largely unwitnessed, the Hindenburg's became a "global media phenomenon" and "one of the biggest news stories of the 20th century", in the words of the writer S. C. Gwynne and the radio personality R. Scott Childers, respectively. Morrison's report is considered among the most famous in radio history.

Some historians have considered the report's significance to the medium of broadcasting. In Tim Crook's view, it "demonstrated radio's power to convey the emotional impact of the events that make news". The historian Anna Accettola observes that, as an early example of breaking news, it "showed that broadcasting styles would need to change in order to maintain a high standard of sharing information during a crisis". Similarly, Christopher H. Sterling and Cary O'Dell cite Morrison's broadcast as an example that proved the radio's role in emergency broadcasting, alongside coverage of the 1937 Ohio River flood. Morrison, asked in 1966 on how his feelings about news reporting changed after the Hindenburg disaster, thought that it "helped open a new way to cover news events", by recording a report of the event and then playing it back.

Morrison's voice is also a subject of note to commentators. Experts such as Grossman argue that the recording disks ran too slow, causing the broadcast to run abnormally quickly when played back—according to the audio historian Michael Biel, by a minimum factor of three percent. Thus, his voice is made to sound high-pitched, when it was actually deep and mellow.

== Later life ==
Morrison's career continued for several decades. While at WLS, he was a cast member of the Sunday morning program Everybody's Hour. He left WLS in 1939 to join Mutual, (Note: Arnold Zeitlin of the Pittsburgh Sun-Telegraph writes that by 1938, Morrison had joined Pittsburgh's WCAE.) proceeding to work for New York stations and then in Pittsburgh. He gradually grew more interested in television. In 1958, Morrison became the first news director at the television station WTAE-TV, based in Pittsburgh, which the writer Craig M. Allen suggests "helped bring TV news to western Pennsylvania". (Note: In 1959, Morrison accepted the National Headliner Award on behalf of WTAE-TV for the station's "consistently outstanding local TV coverage of news.") He later worked freelance. After developing a radio and television section at West Virginia University in the 1960s, he retired from his trade.

An aviation enthusiast, Morrison learned to fly in the late 1920s and served in the Army Air Corps (Oklahoma) during World War II. He was also a lieutenant colonel in the Air Force Reserve. Morrison ran for Congress thrice from Pennsylvania as a Republican: in 1954, 1956, and 1958, and lost every time. A Pittsburgh Sun-Telegraph piece reports that during the last election cycle, he campaigned for tax cuts, save for those that would compromise national defense, as well as for "special incentives to retain the services of skilled federal employees". At this time, Morrison was a borough councilman for Scottdale. In 1975, Universal Studios sent him across the US to promote the film The Hindenburg, which featured an excerpt of his broadcast.

Morrison was married to the West Virginian Mary Jane Kelly; they had no children. As of 1959, he lived in his hometown Scottdale with Mary Jane, and in old age, he resided in Morgantown, West Virginia. A chronic illness eventually led him to be admitted to a Morgantown nursing home. He died there on January 10, 1989, aged 83.

== Bibliography ==
=== Books ===
- Allen, Craig M. (1998). "Morrison, Herbert". In Godfrey, Donald G.; Leigh, Frederic A. (eds.). Historical Dictionary of American Radio. Westport, Connecticut: Greenwood Press. pp. 263–264. ISBN 0-313-29636-7.
- Childers, R. Scott (2008). Chicago's WLS Radio. Charleston, South Carolina: Arcadia Publishing. ISBN 978-0-7385-6194-3.
- Crook, Tim (1998). International Radio Journalism: History, Theory and Practice. London, England: Routledge. ISBN 0-415-09672-3.
- Dunning, John (1998). The Encyclopedia of Old-Time Radio. New York City, New York: Oxford University Press. ISBN 0-19-507678-8.
- Gordon, George N.; Falk, Irving A. (1967). On-the-Spot Reporting: Radio Records History. New York City, New York: Julian Nesser.
- Gwynne, S. C. (2023). His Majesty's Airship : The Life and Tragic Death of the World's Largest Flying Machine (EPUB version). New York City, New York: Scribner. ISBN 978-1982168278.
- Mooney, Michael Macdonald (1972). The Hindenburg. New York City, New York: Bantam Books. ISBN 978-0369065025.
- Sies, Luther F. (2000). Encyclopedia of American Radio, 1920–1960. Jefferson, North Carolina: McFarland & Company. ISBN 0-7864-0452-3.
- Sterling, Christopher H.; Kittross, John M. (1990). Stay Tuned: A Concise History of American Broadcasting (2 ed.). Belmont, California: Wadsworth Publishing Company. ISBN 0-534-11904-2.
- Sterling, Christopher H.; O'Dell, Cary, eds. (2010). The Concise Encyclopedia of American Radio. New York City, New York: Routledge. ISBN 978-0-415-99533-7.
- Vaughn, Christopher, ed. (1991). The Museum of Television and Radio. New York City, New York: Billboard Publications, Inc.

=== Web articles and blogs ===
- Accettola, Anna (2021). "Analysis: The Hindenburg Disaster". EBSCO. Archived from the original on July 22, 2025.
- Biel, Michael (May 6, 1997). "The Hindenburg Broadcast". History of American Broadcasting. Archived from the original on August 14, 2007 – via members.aol.com.
- Grossman, Dan. "Hindenburg Flight Schedule". Airships.net. Archived from the original on June 20, 2025.
- Grossman, Dan. "Oh the Humanity: Herbert Morrison and the Hindenburg". Airships.net. Archived from the original on July 11, 2025.
- Grossman, Dan. "The Hindenburg Disaster". Airships.net. Archived from the original on July 3, 2025.
- McCarthy, Michael (2023). "Crash of the Hindenburg (Herbert Morrison, reporting) (May 6, 1937)" (PDF). Library of Congress. Archived (PDF) from the original on July 8, 2025.
- Schwartz, A. Brad (May 6, 2015). "The Infamous "War of the Worlds" Radio Broadcast Was a Magnificent Fluke". Smithsonian Institution. Archived from the original on August 30, 2025.
- Webster, Donovan (May 4, 2017). "What Really Felled the Hindenburg?". Smithsonian Institution. Archived from the original on July 3, 2025.
- "Herbert Morrison". American Rhetoric. February 16, 2024. Archived from the original on March 30, 2025.
- "Hindenburg disaster and wingsuits". BBC. January 6, 2024. Archived from the original on December 12, 2025.
- "One Man's Crusade to Exonerate Hydrogen for Hindenburg Disaster". American Physical Society. Archived from the original on March 23, 2025.
- "Scenes From Hell". National Archives. Archived from the original on June 9, 2025.

=== News articles ===
- Associated Press (April 12, 1988). "John H. Dent, Former Legislator, 80". The New York Times. Archived from the original on January 20, 2025.
- Associated Press (January 11, 1989). "Herbert Morrison, 83, Hindenburg Reporter". The New York Times. Archived from the original on January 19, 2025.
- Burgess, Milton V. (January 19, 1958). "Dent Favored to Win Vote for Congress". Pittsburgh Sun-Telegraph. pp. 1, 28 – via Newspapers.com. Page 28 here, under the title "Big Democratic Margin Favors Dent for Congress".
- Folkart, Burt A. (January 11, 1989). "Herbert Morrison; Radio Reporter at Hindenburg Crash". Los Angeles Times. Archived from the original on May 12, 2025.
- Frassinelli, Mike (May 6, 2012). "The Hindenburg 75 years later: Memories time cannot erase". NJ.com. Archived from the original on May 16, 2025.
- Haitch, Richard (May 5, 1985). "Follow-Up on the News; Unforgettable Day". The New York Times. Archived from the original on July 17, 2025.
- Plummer, Evans (May 1937). "Plums and Prunes" (PDF). Radio Guide. Chicago, Illinois. p. 12. Archived (PDF) from the original on December 25, 2024.
- Porter, Laura (July 12, 2016). "May 7, 1937: Hindenburg disaster captured on radio". Telegram & Gazette. Archived from the original on December 12, 2025.
- Robertson, Bruce (May 15, 1937). "Radio Gives Fast Zeppelin Coverge" (PDF). Broadcasting. Washington, D.C. p. 14. Archived (PDF) from the original on December 19, 2024.
- Tate, Hal (May 15, 1937). "WLS Scoops the World" (PDF). Broadcasting. Washington, D.C. pp. 14–15. Archived (PDF) from the original on December 19, 2024.
- Wagener, Volker (May 6, 2017). "Hindenburg disaster: 80 years ago". DW News. Archived from the original on July 17, 2025.
- Zeitlin, Arnold (March 22, 1959). "Zep Tragedy a Pioneer Step for Morrison". Pittsburgh Sun-Telegraph. pp. 1, 6 – via Newspapers.com. Page 6 here under the title "Morrison in Atlantic City Fete".
- "Herbert Morrison; Gave Report on Hindenburg". Chicago Tribune. January 11, 1989. Archived from the original on April 16, 2024.
- "He's Celebrating 25 Years in Radio". Pittsburgh Post-Gazette. June 16, 1955. p. 31 – via Newspapers.com.
- "Images keep memory of Hindenburg alive". ABC News (Australia). May 6, 2012. Archived from the original on November 19, 2024.
