= Addison Bain =

American scientist (1935–2025)

- Born: September 23, 1935; Kalispell, Montana, U.S.
- Died: January 22, 2025 (aged 89); Melbourne, Florida, U.S.
- Education: Florida Institute of Technology (BS, MS); California Coast University (PhD)
- Known for: Formulation of the Incendiary Paint Theory of the Hindenburg disaster Co-founder of the National Hydrogen Association

Addison Bain (September 23, 1935 – January 22, 2025) was an American NASA scientist and founding member of the National Hydrogen Association who is credited with postulating the Incendiary Paint Theory (IPT), which posits that the Hindenburg disaster was caused by the electrical ignition of lacquer- and metal-based paints used on the outer hull of the airship. Thus Bain believes that the hydrogen in the airship had no part to play in the initiation of the disaster. This theory, which was proposed in 1997 and recently updated in his 2004 book, The Freedom Element: Living with Hydrogen, has been generally accepted by people interested in promoting hydrogen as a transportation fuel, and generally rejected by people involved with airships and their history.

== Career ==
The primary refutation is based on the work of A. J. Dessler, D. E. Overs, and W. H. Appleby. Their work, both theoretical and experimental, has concluded that even if the airship was covered with solid rocket fuel, as the Incendiary Paint Theory claims, it would still have taken 12 hours for the airship to burn had hydrogen not been present. This refutation misses the point of the theory, which relates only to what started the fire, not how it continued.. Before Bain joined NASA, he worked on the construction of the Noxon Rapids Dam. He later served in the U.S. Army, where he got assigned to Redstone Arsenal and started working with Wernher von Braun's rocket development team.

Bain's interest in the Hindenburg disaster developed during the late 1960s through his work involving hydrogen and exposure to discussions of the disaster in hydrogen safety literature. In 1994, he acquired pieces of the Hindenburg's exterior covering and participated in a scientific examination of the material. The testing examined the composition and properties of the airship's outer coating. The analysis contributed to Bain's argument that materials used to coat the airship's exterior may have played a role in starting the fire.

The case for the Incendiary Paint Theory is explained in Bain's televised demonstration of the extreme flammability of a piece of the actual skin of the Hindenburg preserved from the disaster. Bain demonstrates the incendiary properties of the Hindenburg skin and then asks why the bits of skin ejected from the inferno continued to burn brightly on their way down instead of self-extinguishing once removed from the zone of densest hydrogen. This question of "self-extinguishing" is important, since his critics point out that the components of the doping compound used on the skin should put themselves out if removed from any fuel for fire, and should not have burned so quickly if the fire actually started with the skin instead of the hydrogen.

Critics also counter that Bain did not actually ignite the skin with a quick electrical charge but instead uses a Jacob's Ladder with continuous electrical charge, which required several strikes to ignite. Additionally, Bain was required to correctly position the fabric to allow it to ignite. Another part of the IPT hypothesizes that the mooring cables, which were designed to ground any static electricity on the surface of the airship, worked only partly in this instance; since some of the skin panels still carried an electric charge, at least one of them must have sparked, causing the initial outbreak of fire. Thus it has yet to be proven that an electrical charge could ignite the Hindenburg skin. The design of the ship would likely exclude the skin being an ignition point due to the properties of the doping process, the insulation from the frame and skin of the grounding drop-lines, and the inability of any experiment to ignite the skin via electric spark consistent with the conditions of the 1937 disaster.

The television show MythBusters also dedicated the opening episode for their 2007 season to Bain's theory. Scale models of the Hindenburg were built and tested with skin reproductions. One model had no hydrogen while the other did. The only burn that replicated the Hindenburg burn used hydrogen.

== Personal life and death ==
Bain attended Flathead High School, received his Bachelor of Science in space technology from Florida Institute of Technology (FIT), his Master of Science in systems management from FIT, and his Ph.D. in engineering management from CCU.

Bain died on January 22, 2025, at the age of 89.

== Bibliography ==
- The Freedom Element: Living with Hydrogen. Blue Note Books. 2004. ISBN 978-1-878398-97-0.

== Sources ==
- "The hydrogen technology assessment, phase 1", 1991, NASA Technical Reports Server
- "An assessment of the government liquid hydrogen requirements for the 1995-2005 time frame including addendum, liquid hydrogen production and commercial demand in the United States",1990, NASA Technical Reports Server
- "An assessment of the government liquid hydrogen requirements for the 1995-2005 time frame",1990, MASA Technical Reports Server
