= Werner Franz (Hindenburg) =

Hindenburg disaster survivor (1922–2014)

- Born: May 22, 1922; Frankfurt am Main, Germany
- Died: August 13, 2014 (aged 92); Frankfurt am Main, Germany
- Occupations: Cabin boy (formerly), skating instructor
- Known for: survival of the Hindenburg disaster

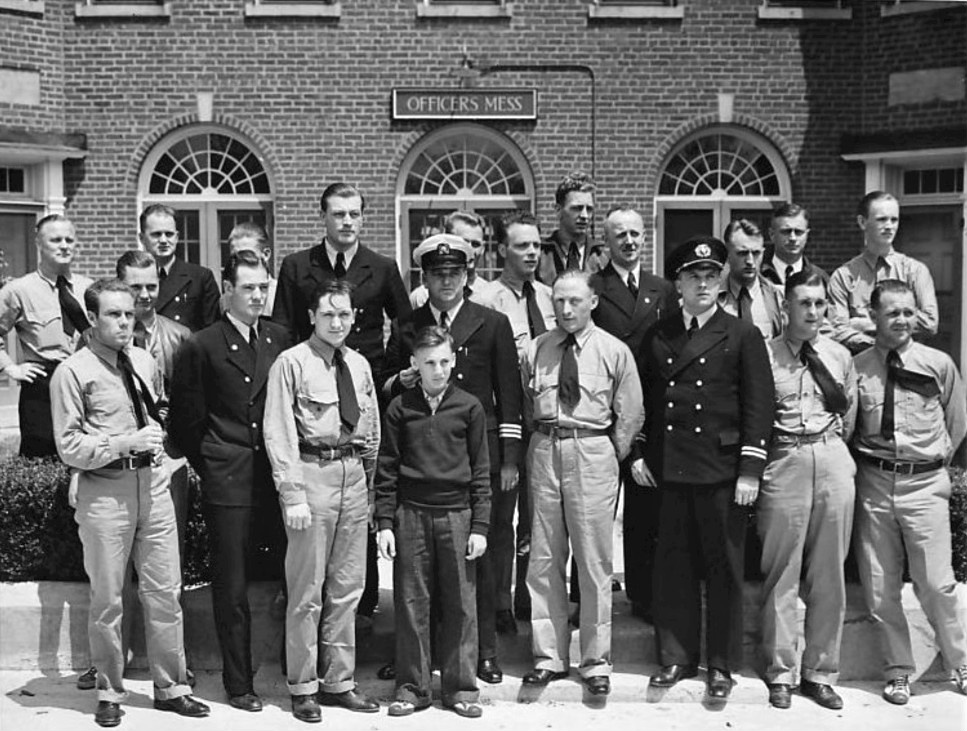
Werner Franz (middle juvenile) among survivors

Werner Franz (May 22, 1922 – August 13, 2014) was the cabin boy aboard the ill-fated LZ 129 Hindenburg which crashed on May 6, 1937. At the time of the crash he was only 14 years old. He was the last known surviving crew member of the Hindenburg as of his death in 2014. On the airship his duties included serving all of the ship's officers and crew. Later on in life he became an ice and roller skate coach. Some of his pupils include Olympic silver medalist Marika Kilius and her partner Franz Ningel.

== Biography ==
Werner Franz was born in Frankfurt am Main, Germany.

On May 6th, 1937, when Franz was just 16 days shy of his 15th birthday, he was aboard the LZ 129 Hindenburg for his duties as a cabin boy. At approximately 7:25 PM, when the Hindenburg was above the NAS Lakehurst in Manchester Township, New Jersey, the Hindenburg burst into flames and began to fall. Though surrounded by flames, Franz was doused by water from a bursting ballast tank which gave him time to work out an escape. He jumped out of a cloth supply hatch, landing on the ground and rushing away from the remains of the Hindenburg as they nearly crashed onto him.

Franz was one of 62 survivors, with 35 fatalities.

Franz gave testimony to the US Commerce Department's board of inquiry.

Franz would later in life become a roller and ice skating instructor, even teaching Marika Kilius and her partner Franz Ningel.

Werner Franz died on August 13, 2014.

== Sources ==
- "Werner Franz". Faces of the Hindenburg. 29 September 2009.
- "Werner Franz, Survivor of the Hindenburg's Crew, Dies at 92". The New York Times. August 29, 2014.
