= Nabl =

Nabl is an Austrian German-language surname, a variant of Nabel. Notable people with the surname include:

- Josef Nabl (1876–1953), Austrian physicist
- Franz Nabl (1883–1974), Austrian writer, the namesake of the Franz Nabl Prize

== See also ==
- NABL (disambiguation)
- Nabla (disambiguation)
