= Nabla =

Nabla may refer to any of the following:

- the nabla symbol ∇
  - the vector differential operator, also called del, denoted by the nabla
- Nabla, tradename of a type of rail fastening system (of roughly triangular shape)
- Nabla (moth), a genus of moths
- Nabla (instrument), the Greek word for a Phoenician stringed instrument after the triangular shape of which all of the above are named, reported as "nebel/nevel" in Hebrew sources.
- Ranjan Daimary or D. R. Nabla, an Indian militant

== See also ==
- nambla
