= Phoinix (instrument) =

Ancient Phoenician stringed instrument

The phoinix (Greek: φοῖνιξ, romanized: phoinix; also phoenix) was an ancient stringed instrument, likely a type of lyre or harp, associated with the Phoenicians. It is primarily known through references in classical Greek literature, most notably in the Deipnosophists of Athenaeus, where ancient authors attribute its invention and name directly to Phoenicia.

== Description ==
The exact construction and classification of the phoinix remain a subject of debate among modern organologists, though it is generally categorized as a plucked chordophone. Classical sources describe it alongside other foreign stringed instruments introduced to Greece from Phoenicia, such as the nablas. Classical literature attests to several linguistic variants for the instrument, including phoinikion, lyrophoinix, and lyrophoinikion. Although precise structural details are unclear, Herodotus noted that the arms of the instrument were crafted from Libyan antelope horns. Additionally, a passage in the pseudo-Aristotelian Problems indicates that the instrument was capable of playing octave concords.

The instrument derived its name either from its geographical origin in Phoenicia (Phoinikē) or from the phoinix date palm tree, whose wood may have been utilized in constructing its soundboard or frame.

== Ancient sources ==
Early literary attestations of the phoinix (and its diminutive phoinikion) begin with the archaic lyric poet Alcaeus. The instrument was also identified as a foreign import by the fourth-century BC music theorist Aristoxenus. The phoinix is discussed in Book XIV of the Deipnosophists by the second-century AD Greek rhetorician Athenaeus. Athenaeus compiles testimonies from earlier Hellenistic historians and musicologists regarding the origins of various musical instruments:

Now Ephorus, and Scamon in his treatise On Inventions, say that this instrument called the phoenix derives its name from having been invented by the Phoenicians.

Athenaeus further notes that the fourth-century BC historian Aristoxenus mentioned the phoinix in his works on music, grouping it with other non-Hellenic stringed instruments used in antiquity, including the magadis and the sambuca.

== See also ==
- Gingras (instrument) – Phoenician flute
- Nevel (instrument) – Musical instrument
- Kinnor – Ancient Israelite musical instrument
