= Phoinix =

Phoinix may refer to:

- In mythology, any of the uses of Phoenix, including several heroes and the mythical bird
- Phoinix (Caria), a town of ancient Caria, now in Turkey
- Phoinix (Crete), a town of ancient Crete mentioned in the Bible
- Phoinix (Lycia), a town of ancient Lycia, now in Turkey
- Phoinix (instrument), ancient Phoenician stringed instrument
- 4543 Phoinix, a minor planet
