= Nabel =

Nabel is a German-language surname. Notable people with the surname include:

- Andrey Nabel (1780–1833), Russian general
- Elizabeth Nabel, American cardiologist
- Gary Nabel, American virologist and immunologist
- Konrad Nabel (1950–2021), German politician

== See also ==
- Nabl
