= Tibia (reedpipe) =

Ancient Roman wind instrument

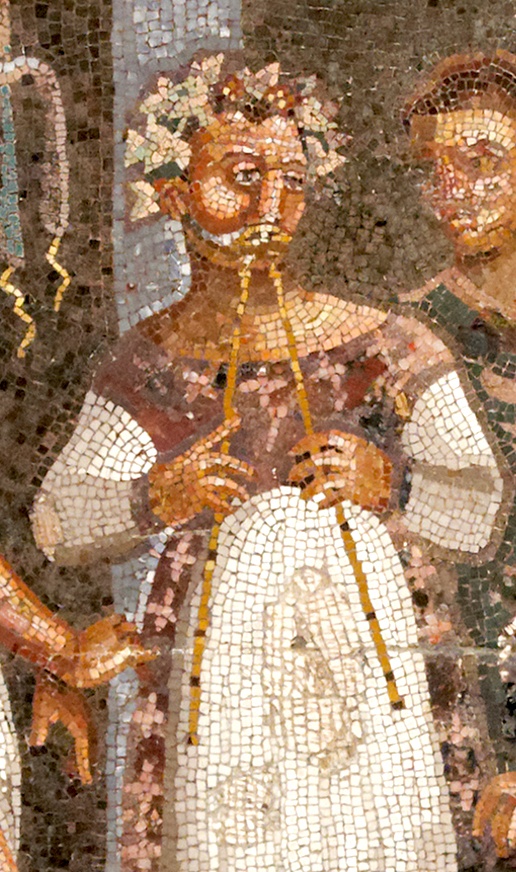
- Man playing tibiae, detail from Choregos actors MAN Napoli Inv9986.

Woodwind instrument
- Classification: woodwind
- Hornbostel–Sachs classification: Reed aerophones: 422.111.2 and 422.121.2 (Double reed instruments)
- Developed: Closely related to Greek aulos and other ancient reedpipe instruments

In ancient Rome, the tibia (from Latin 'pipe'; plural tibiae) was a musical instrument equivalent to the ancient Greek aulos (αὐλός). The word tibia is similar to the English word pipes (in the instrument sense), in that — while it describes instruments that are blown through at the musician's mouth and have fingerholes to choose notes — the word lumps together different instruments which today would be put into different classes, such as reedpipes or duct flutes. Single-reed clarinets, double-reed shawms, and lip-sounded trumpets are all possibly described by the word tibia.

== Construction ==
Tibia were constructed of materials which were naturally hollow tubes or could be hollowed out, including "reed, cane, box-wood, horn, metal, and the tibia or shin-bone of some birds and animals."

The name is related to the word for bones of birds and animals, and possibly came from use of these in musical instruments. This practice is still in used in the Middle East and Central Asia in the Ghoshmeh.

Tibiae and aulos were played with double reeds, kept in a separate box.

== Tibia curva, reedpipe ==
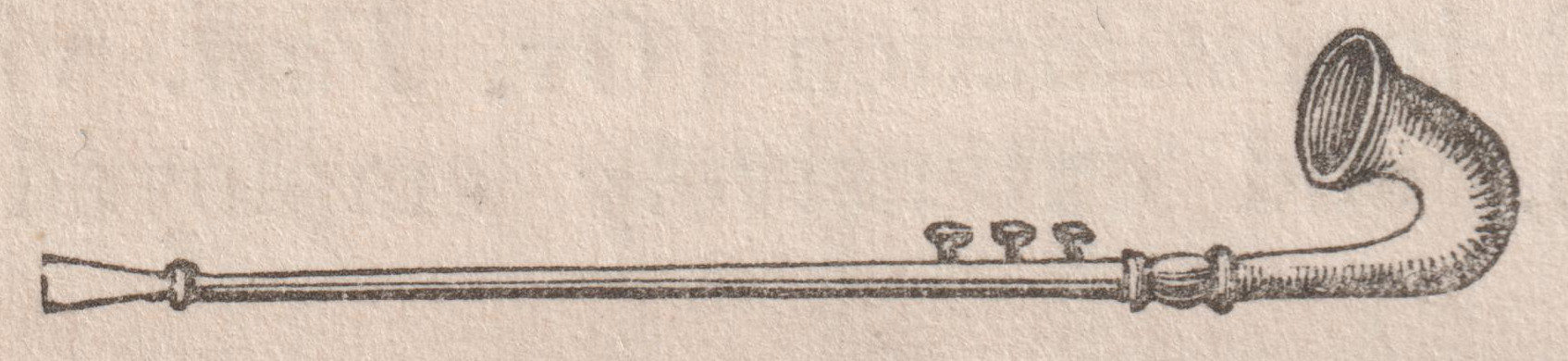
Tibia curva (ἔλυμος). Boxwood body with curved section "like a horn" attached to the end. "Phrygian pipe. Used in ceremonies of Cybele.

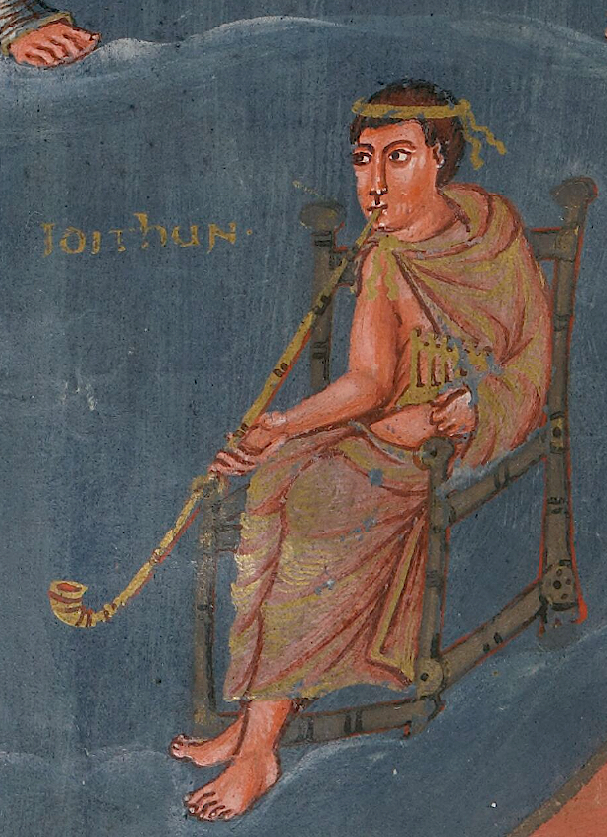
845 A.D., Carolingian Empire. Tibia curva.

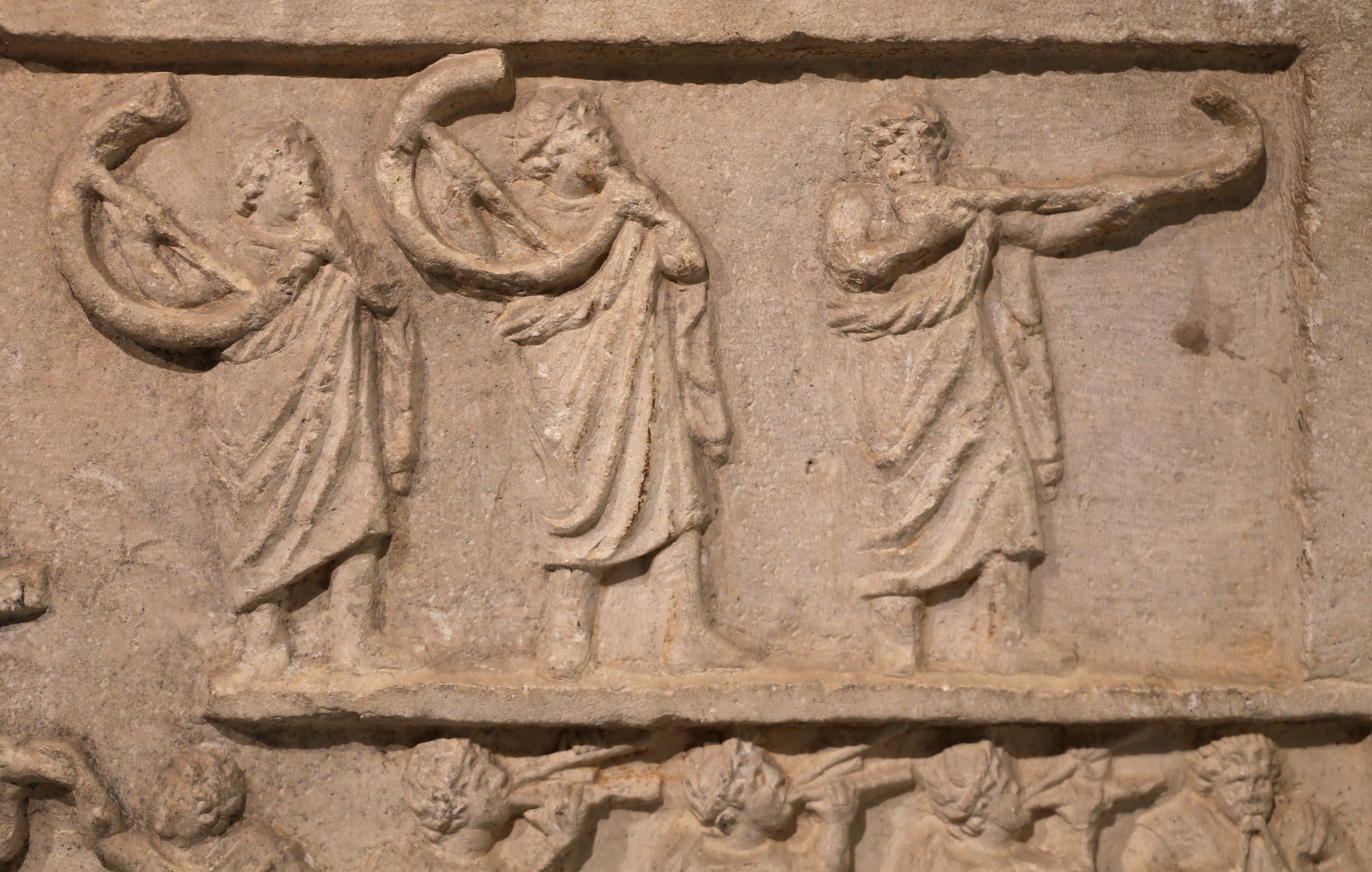
Roman soldiers with cornus and a tiba curva.

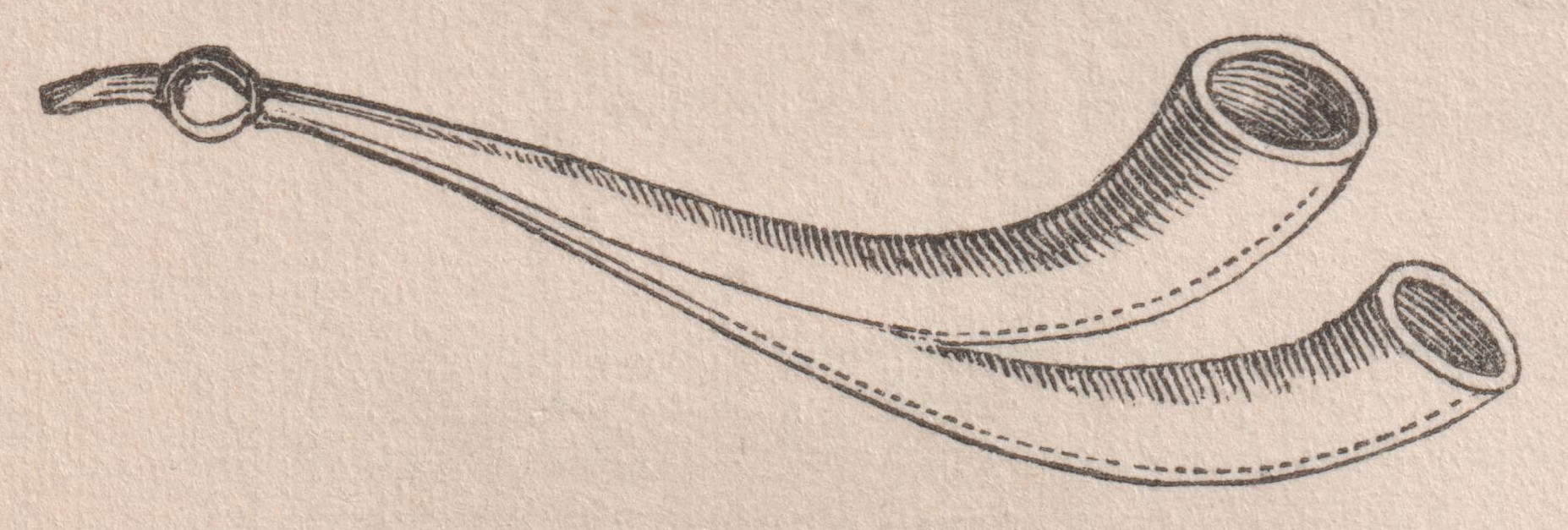
The tibia curva sometimes was illustrated with a "double branch". Possibly an instrument like the zamar, two double pipes bound together.

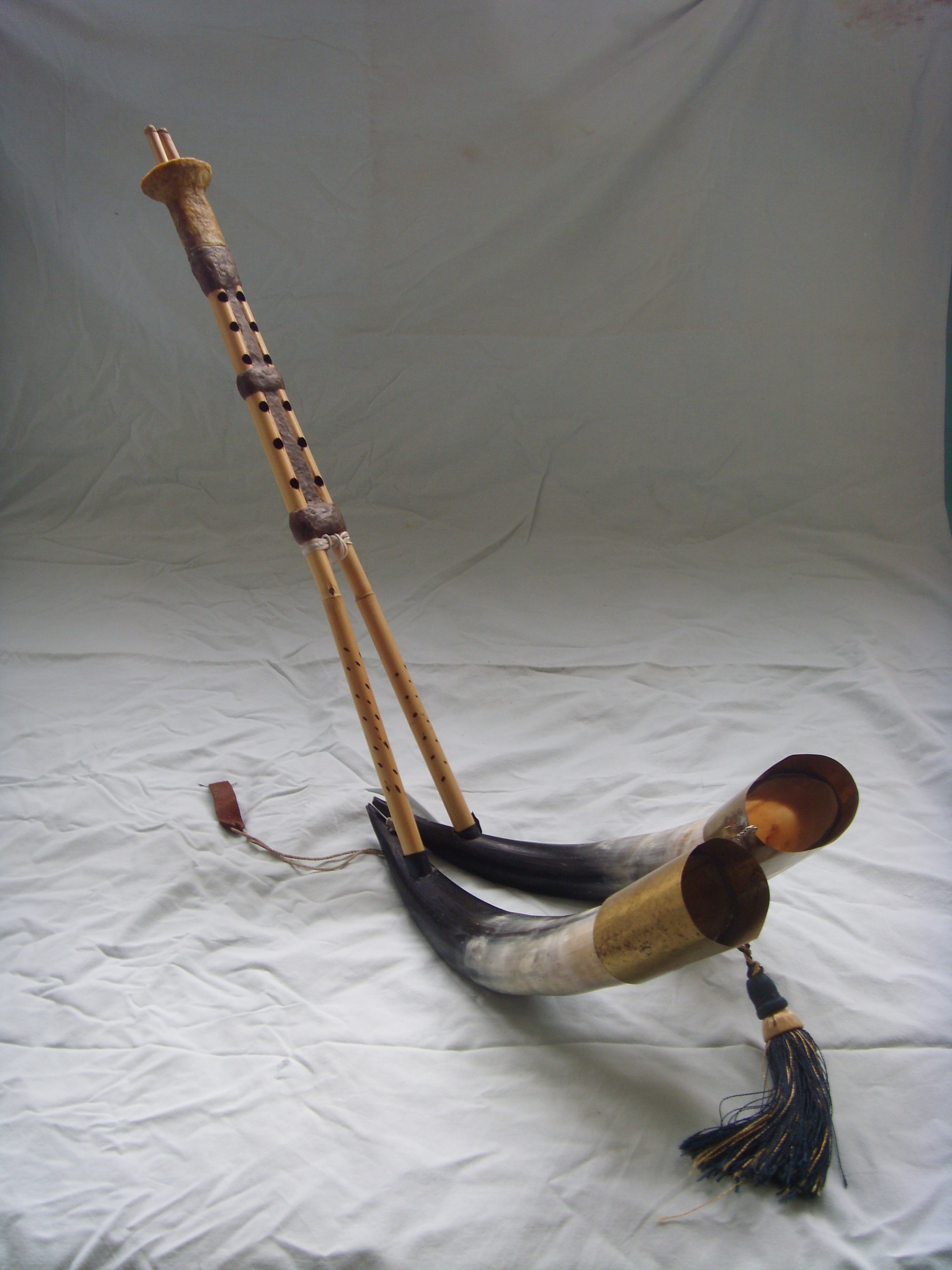
Zamar, used in parts of Morocco and Algeria

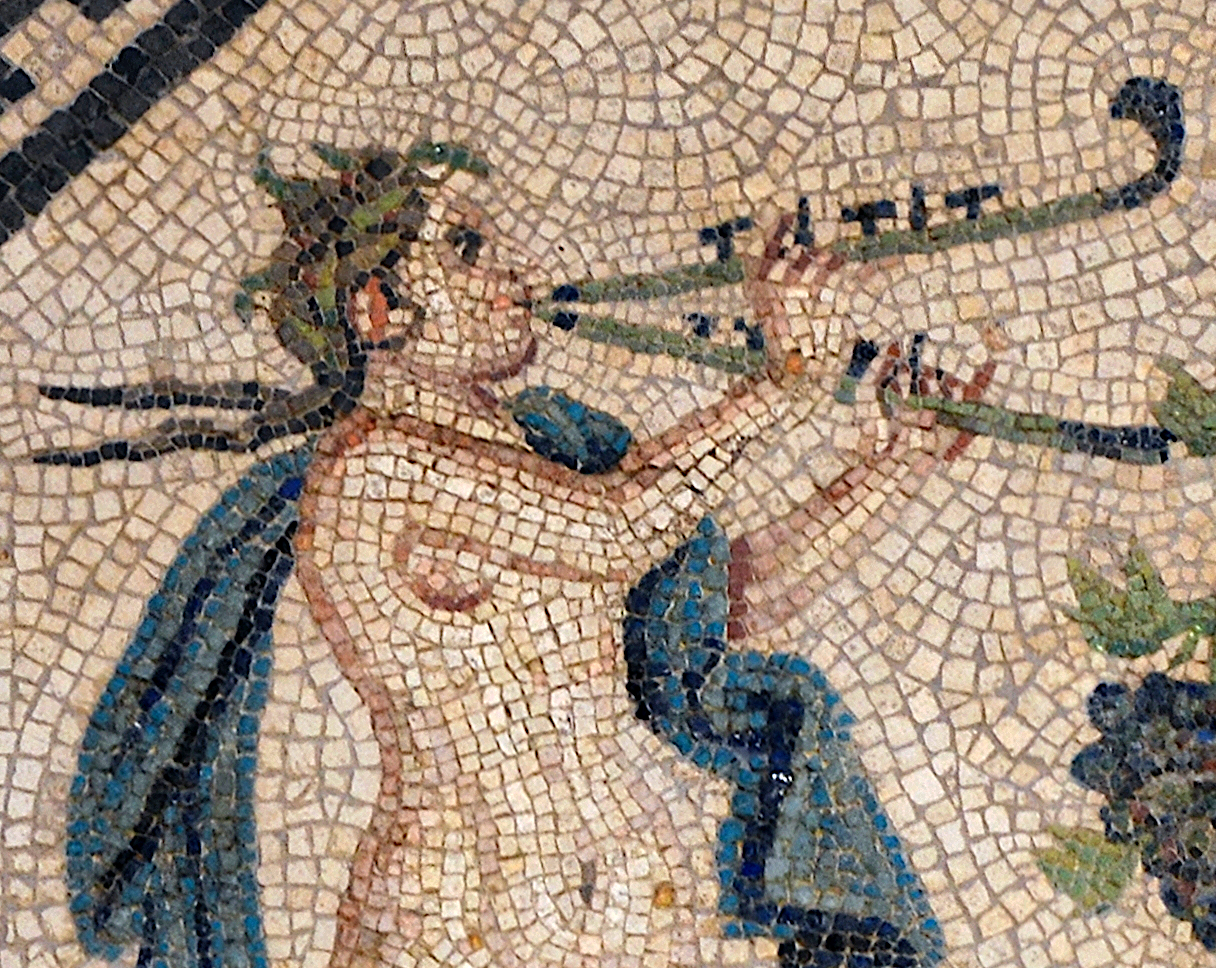
Circa 220 A.D, Cologne, Germany (former Roman Empire). Image of a maenad playing a tibia curva as part of a pair of tibia. Dionysosmosaik "Römisch-Germanisches Museum", Cologne, Germany.

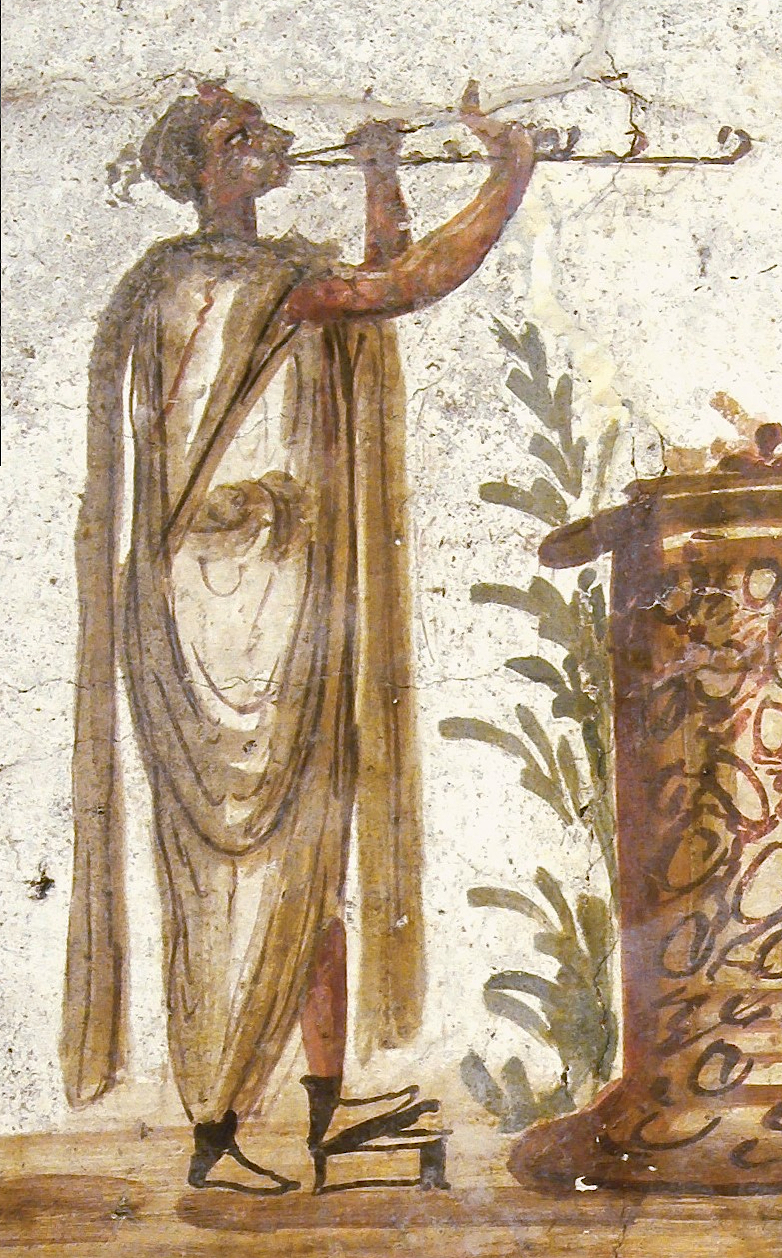
69-79 A.D., Pompeii. Tibia curva, from House of Cipius Pamphilus Felix (VII. 6. 38). Inv. No 8905

== Tibia pares, double reedpipe ==
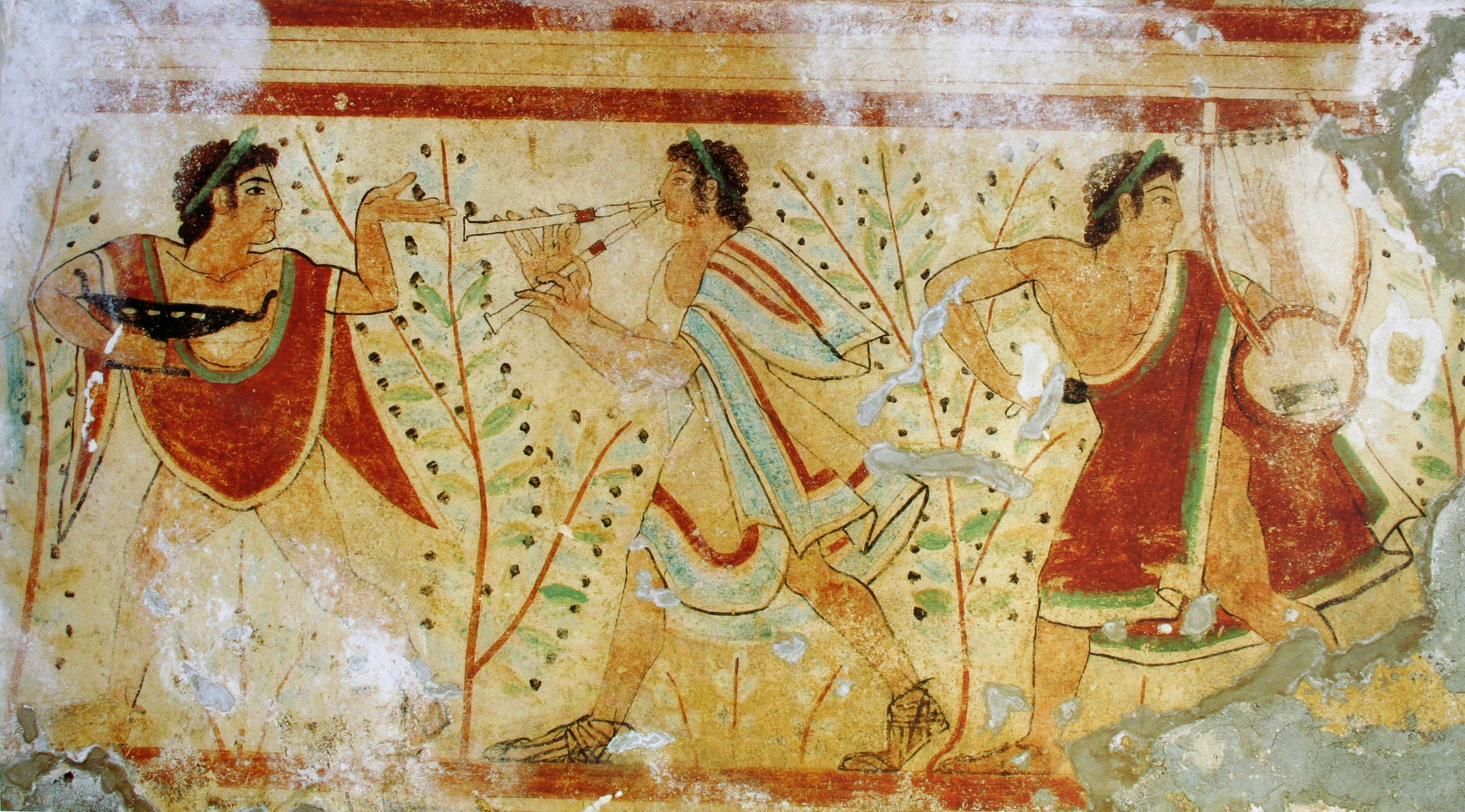
475 B.C., Italian peninsula, Etruscans. Among those who became part of the Roman Empire were the Etruscans, who had their own double reedpipes. Same style as the Greek aulos.

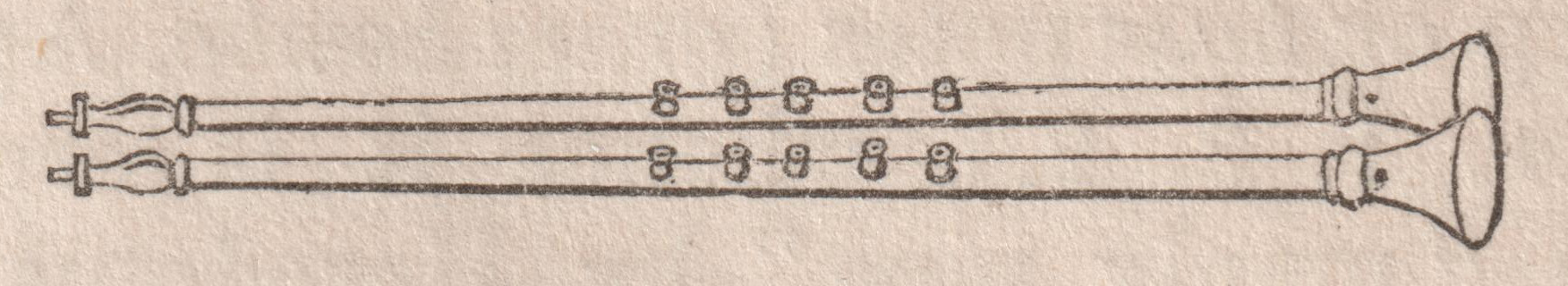
Tibiae pares (ζεύγη). "A pair of pipes, of equal length and bore, both of which produced the same tone, viz. both base or both treble." These were held, one in each hand and played together by that musician. Had a double reed bundle, inserted into the pipe's end.

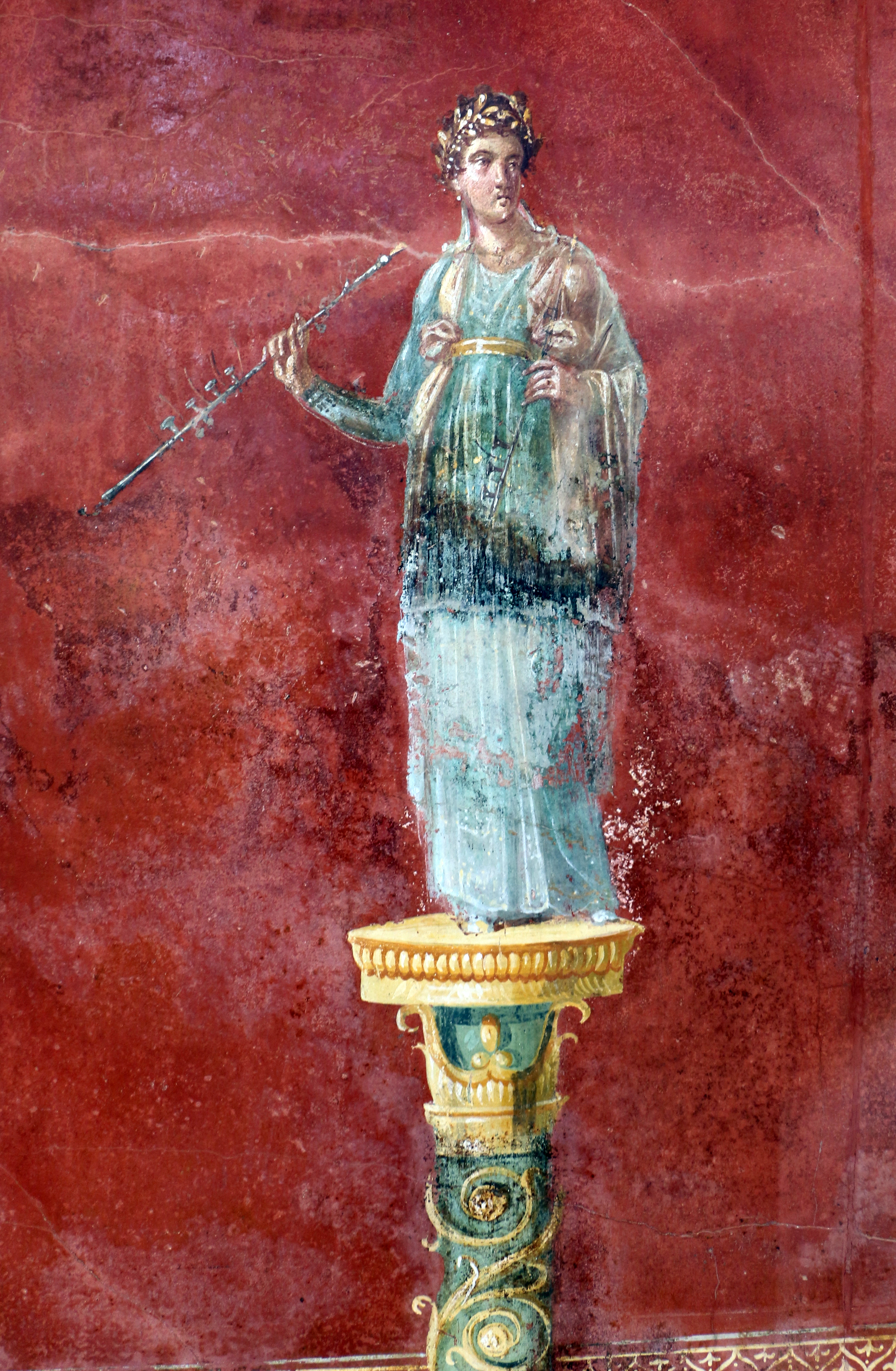
Middle of the 1st century A.D., Pompeii. Euterpe with tibiae. The reeds are visible in one of the instruments.

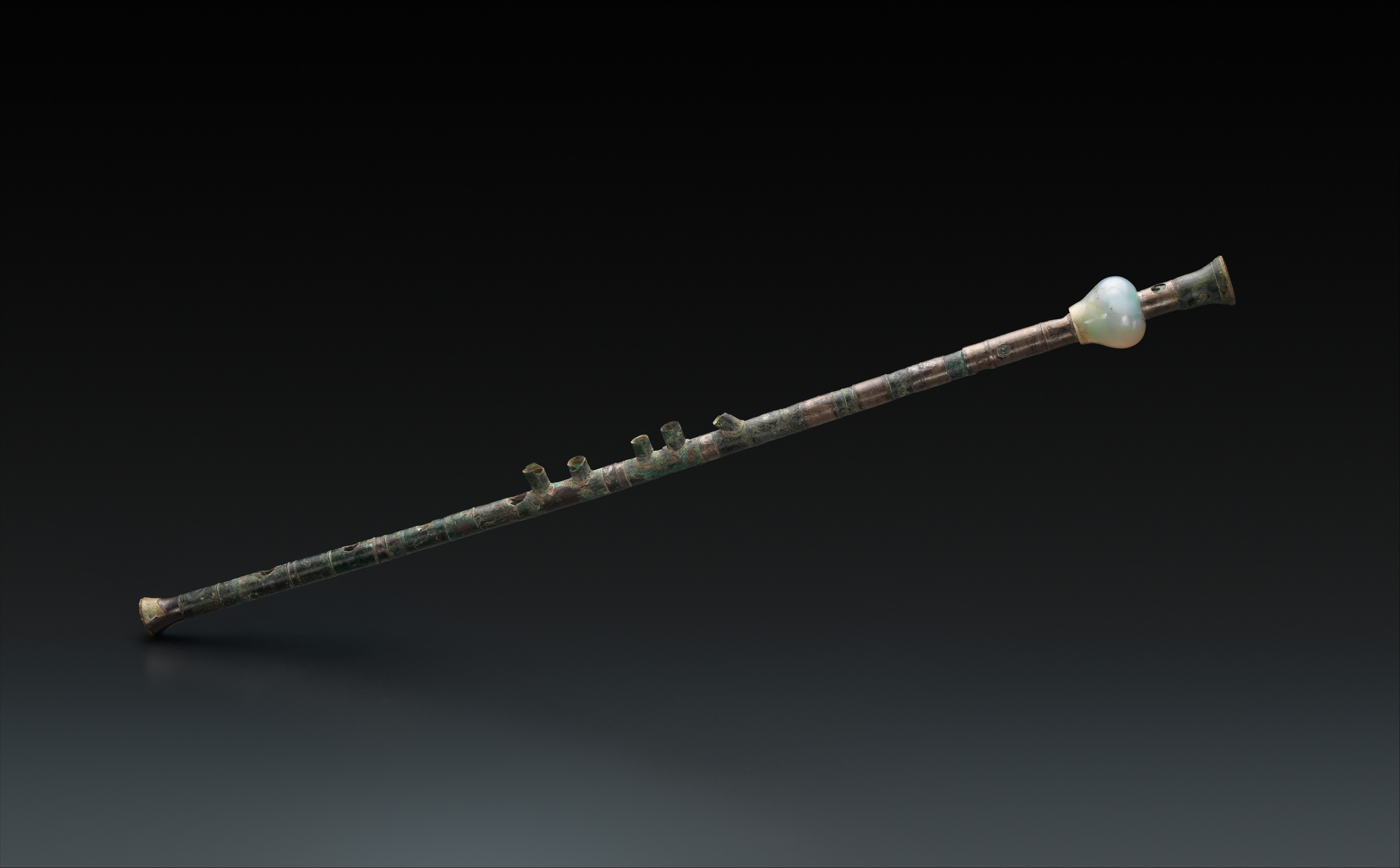
circa 1-500 A.D., Syria. Tibia of silver and ivory. A single pipe of a tibiae pares pair. Side view.

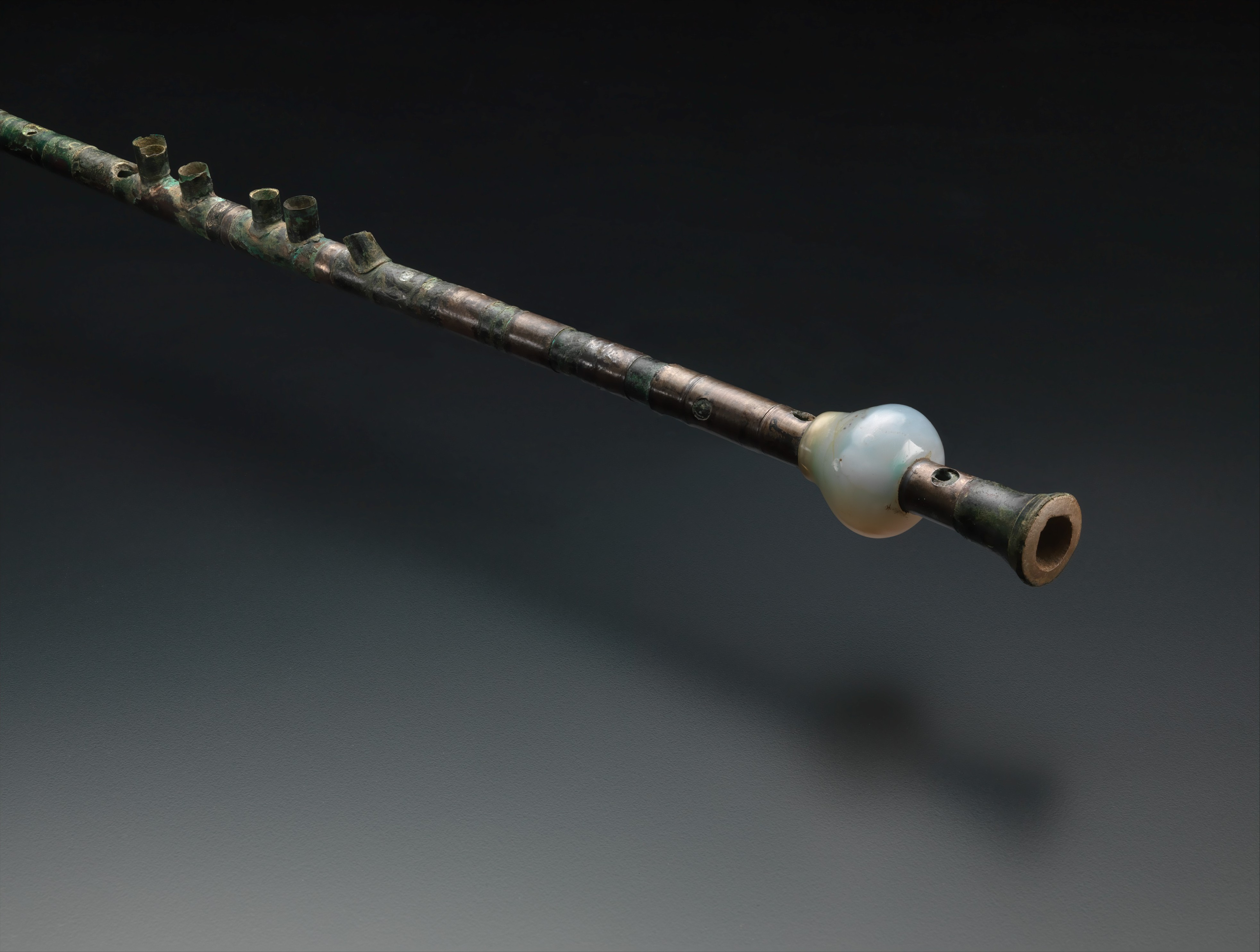
circa 1-500 A.D., Syria. Tibia of silver and ivory. A single pipe of a tibiae pares pair. End view, where the 2-reed bundle was insterted.

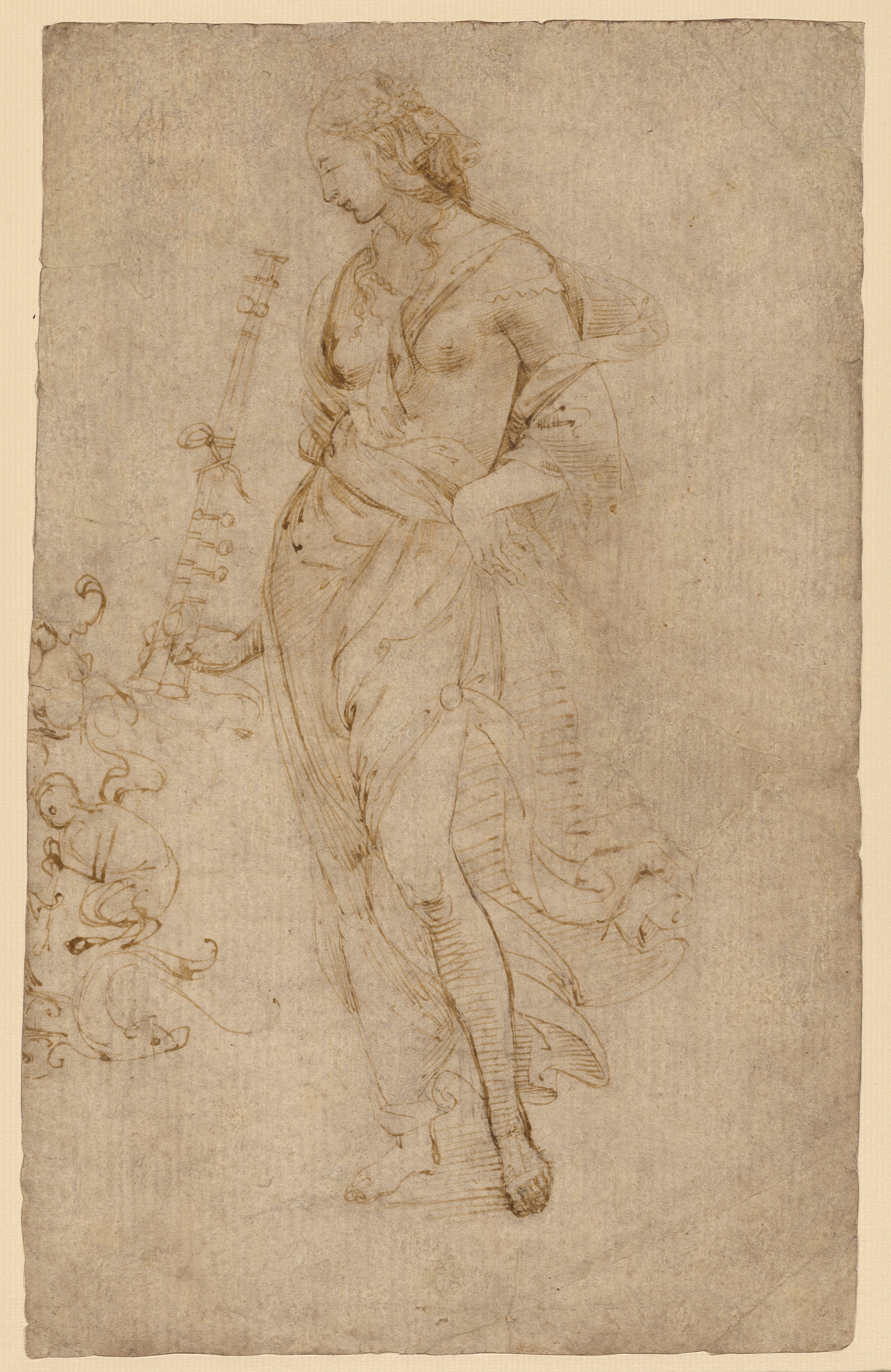
Tibiae pares in the hands of a female musician.

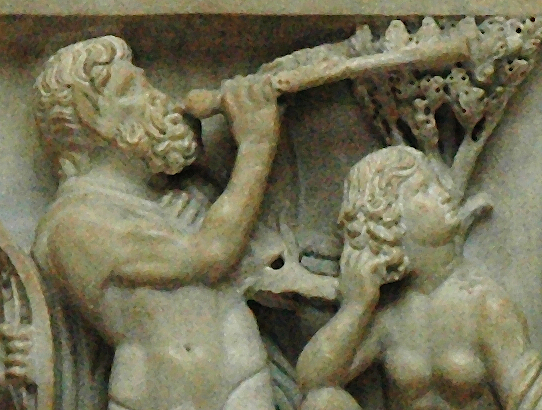
Circa 290–300 AD., Tuscany. Tibia in the style of the metal tibiae, from the Sarcophagus Apollo Marsyas Louvre Ma2347

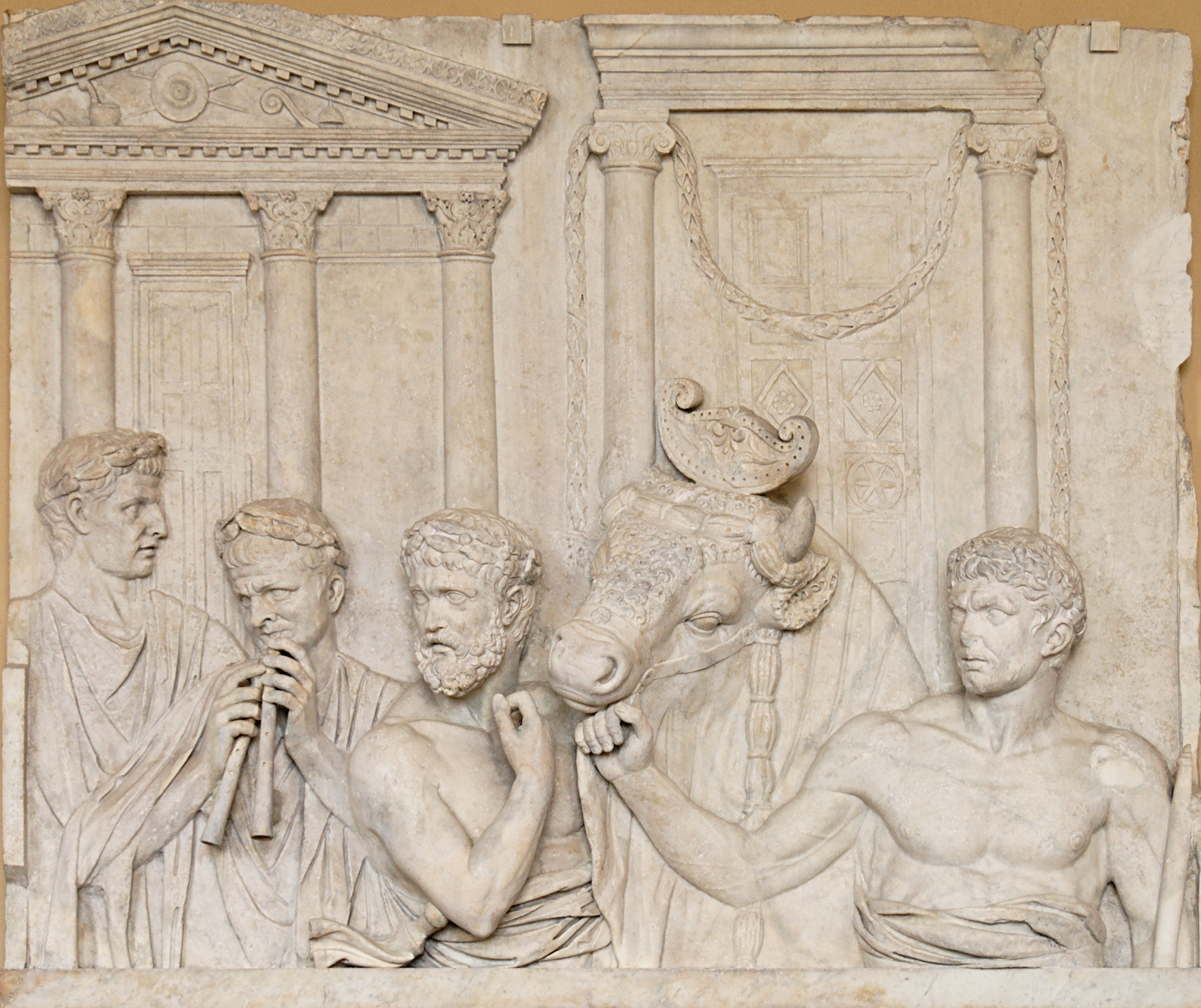
Tibia pares, pipes of equal length. These are short, giving higher (treble) pitch.

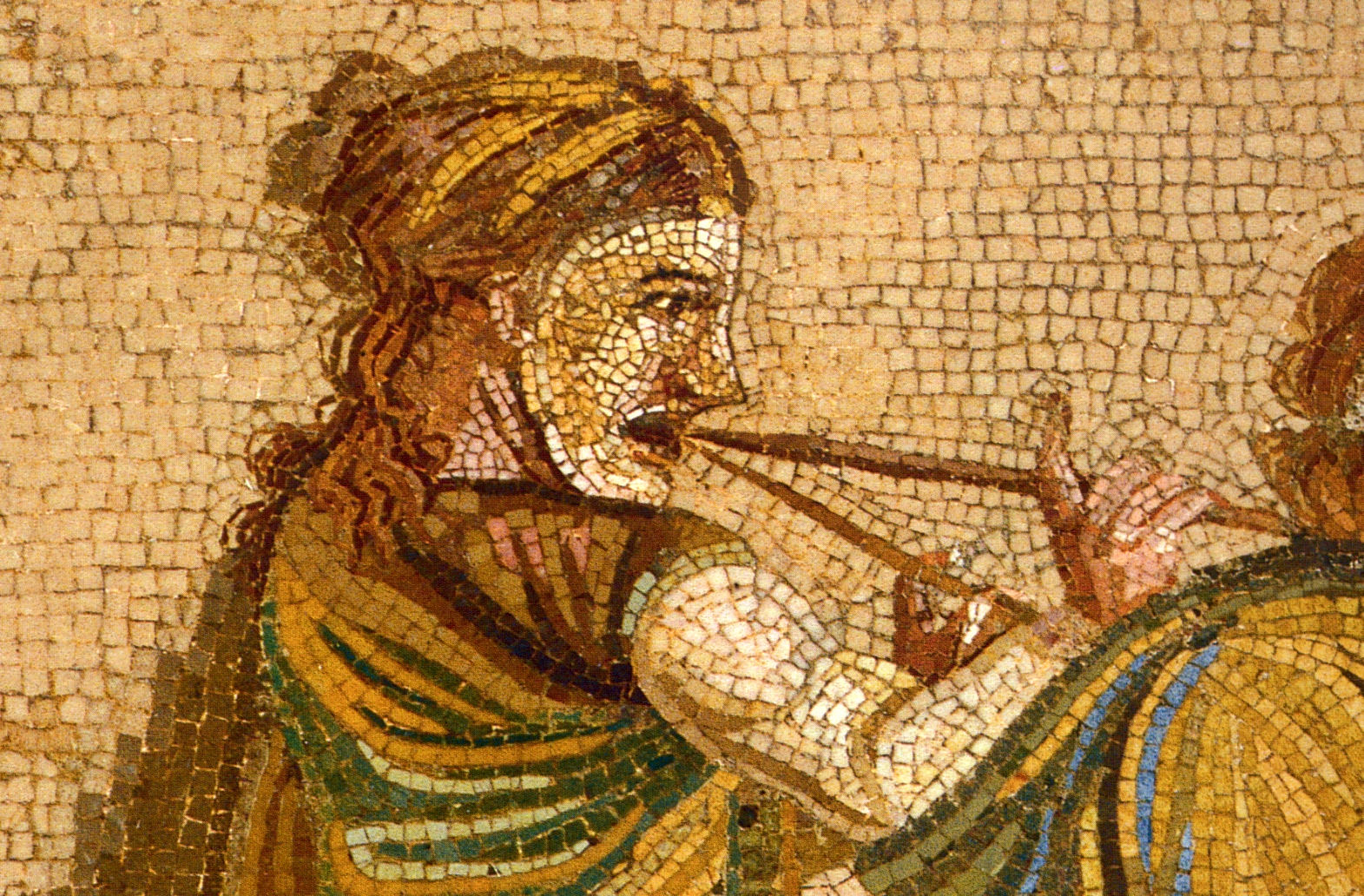
Street musician, Pompeii. Apparent reed or wood-bodied instrument.

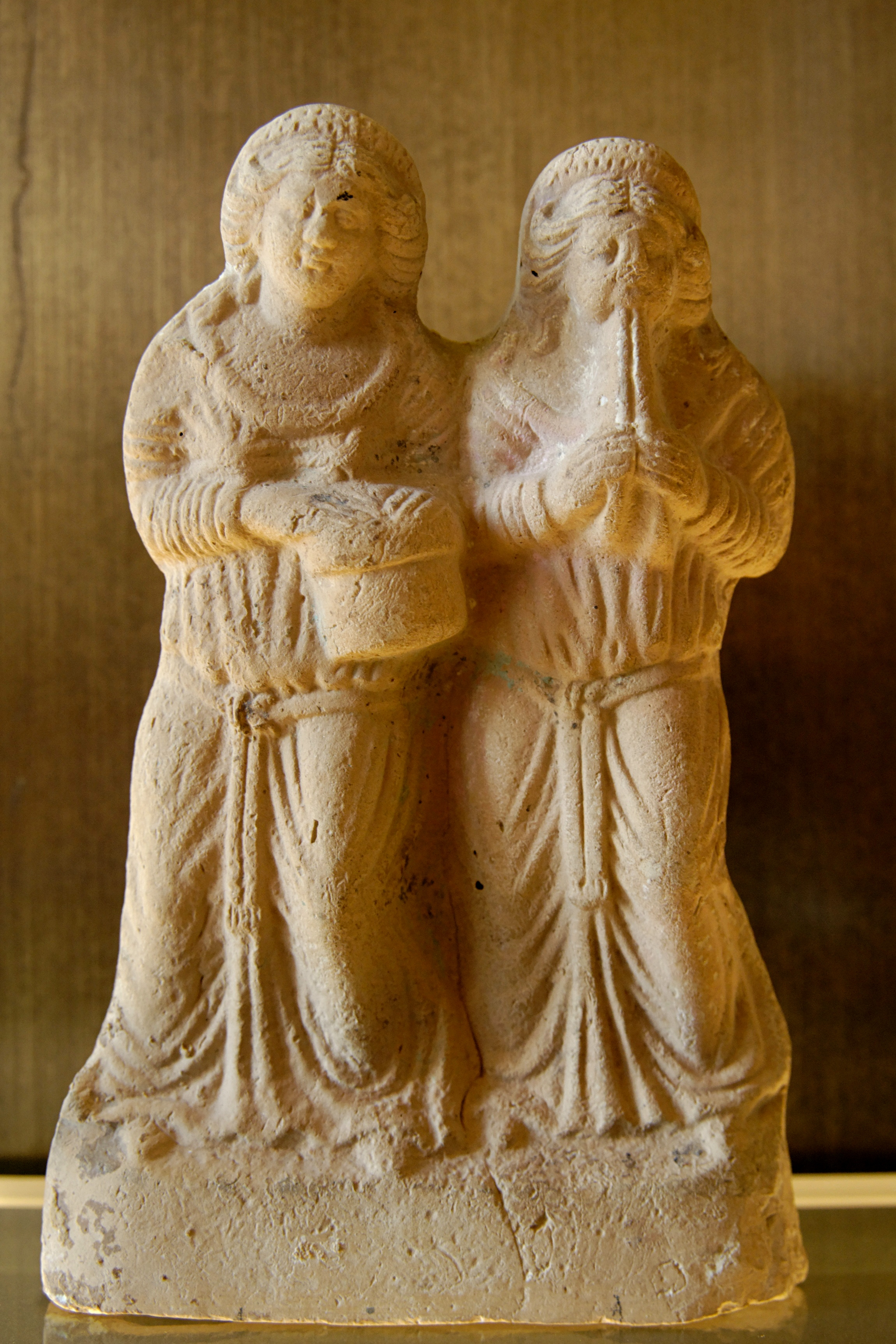
2nd-3rd century A.D., Roman Syria. Tibia and tambourine players

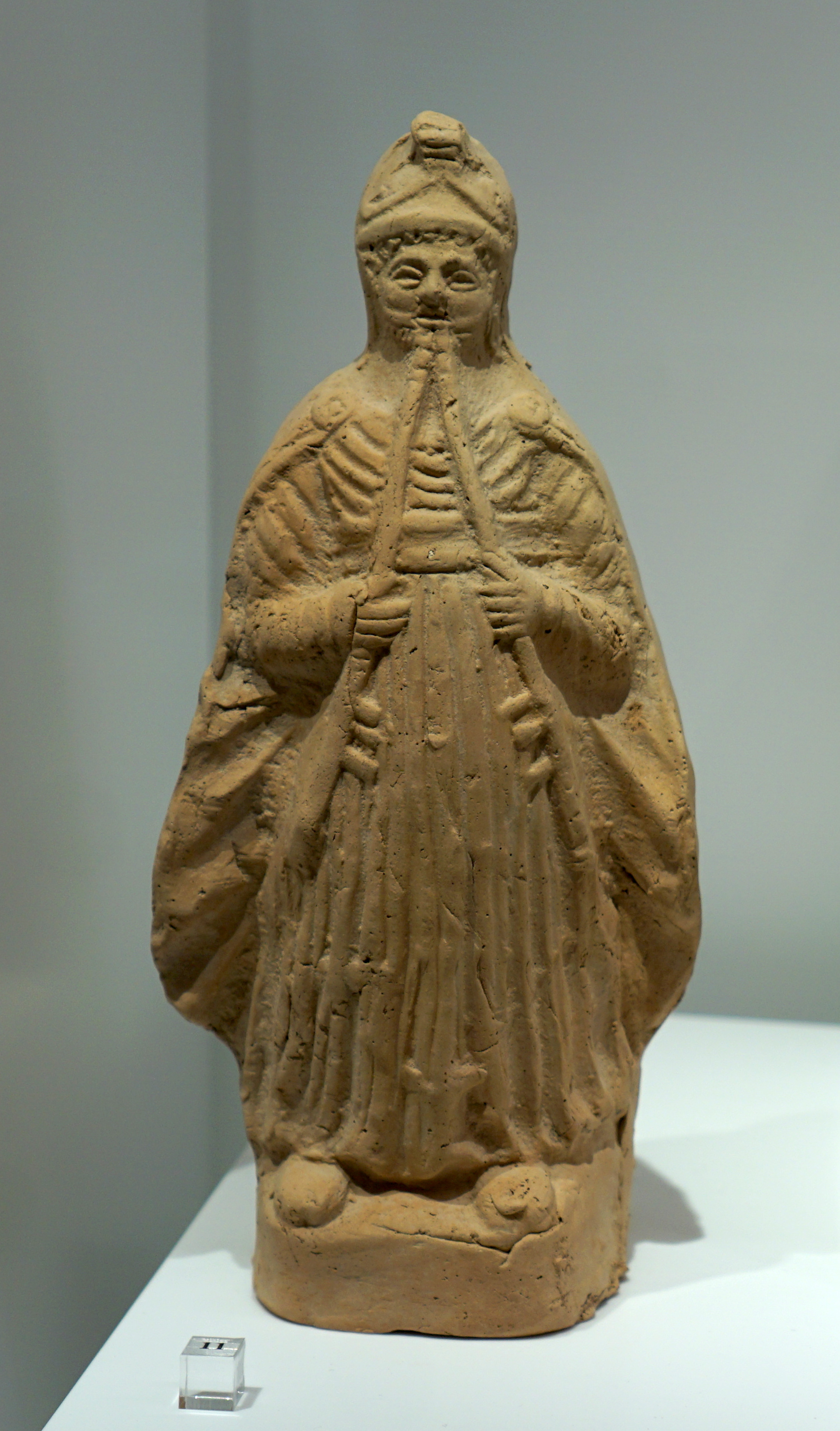
58 B.D. - 395 A.D., Cyprus

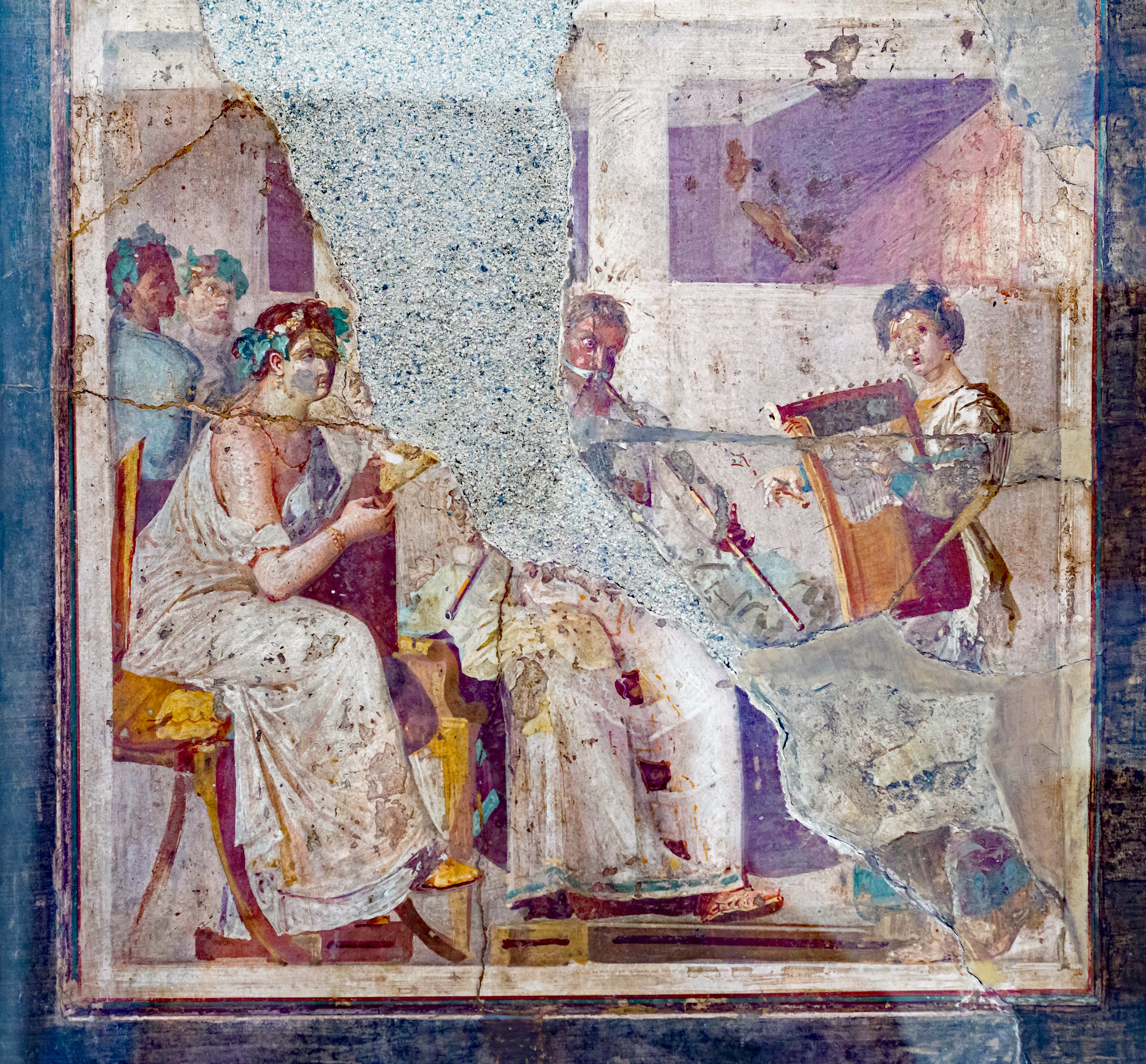
Actress singing, actor playing tibiae, girl playing cithara. Antique fresco in Herculaneum. Tibia appears to be wood or reed-bodied, without raised fingerholes of metal tibiae.

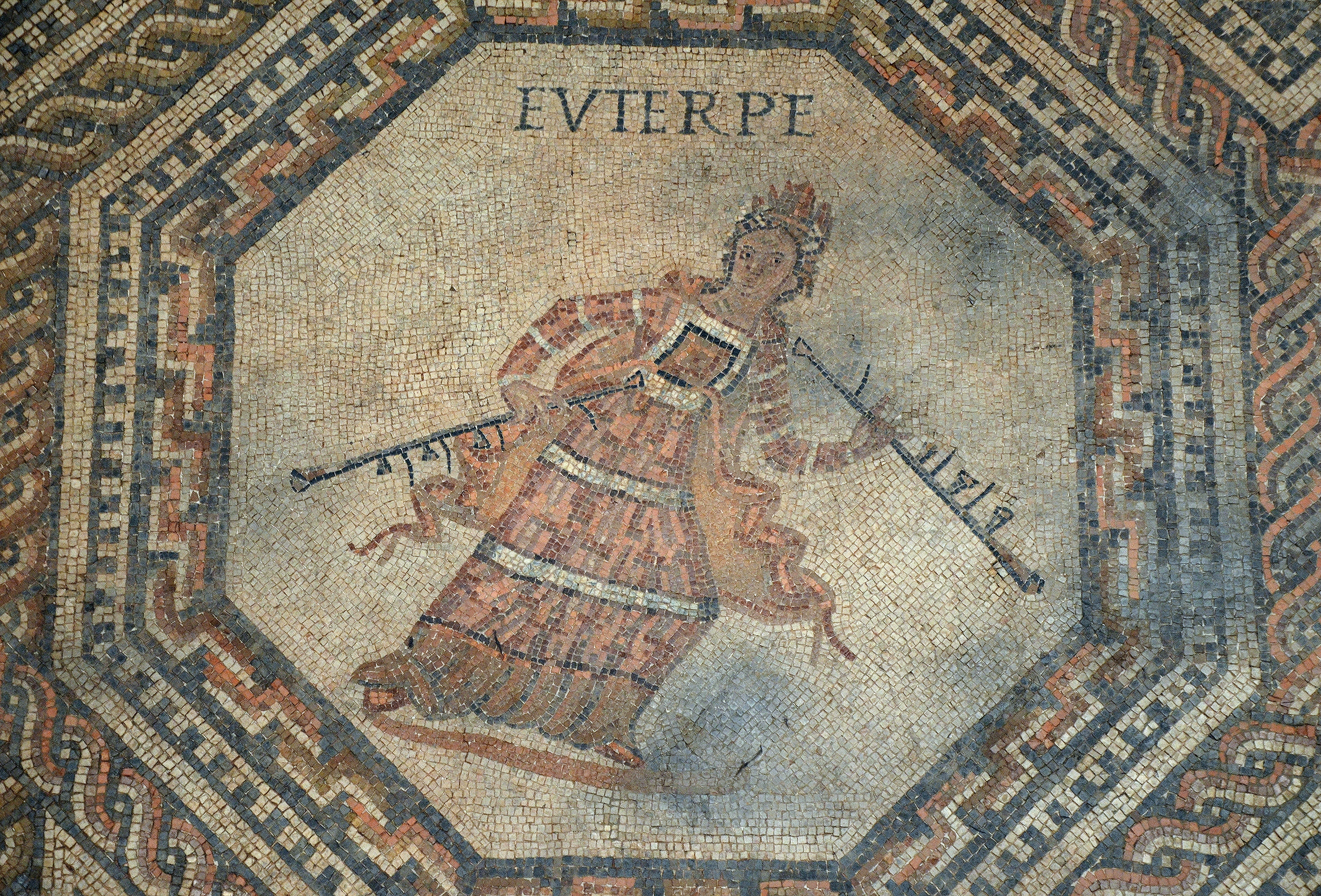
Circa 240 A.D. Euterpe playing tibiae.

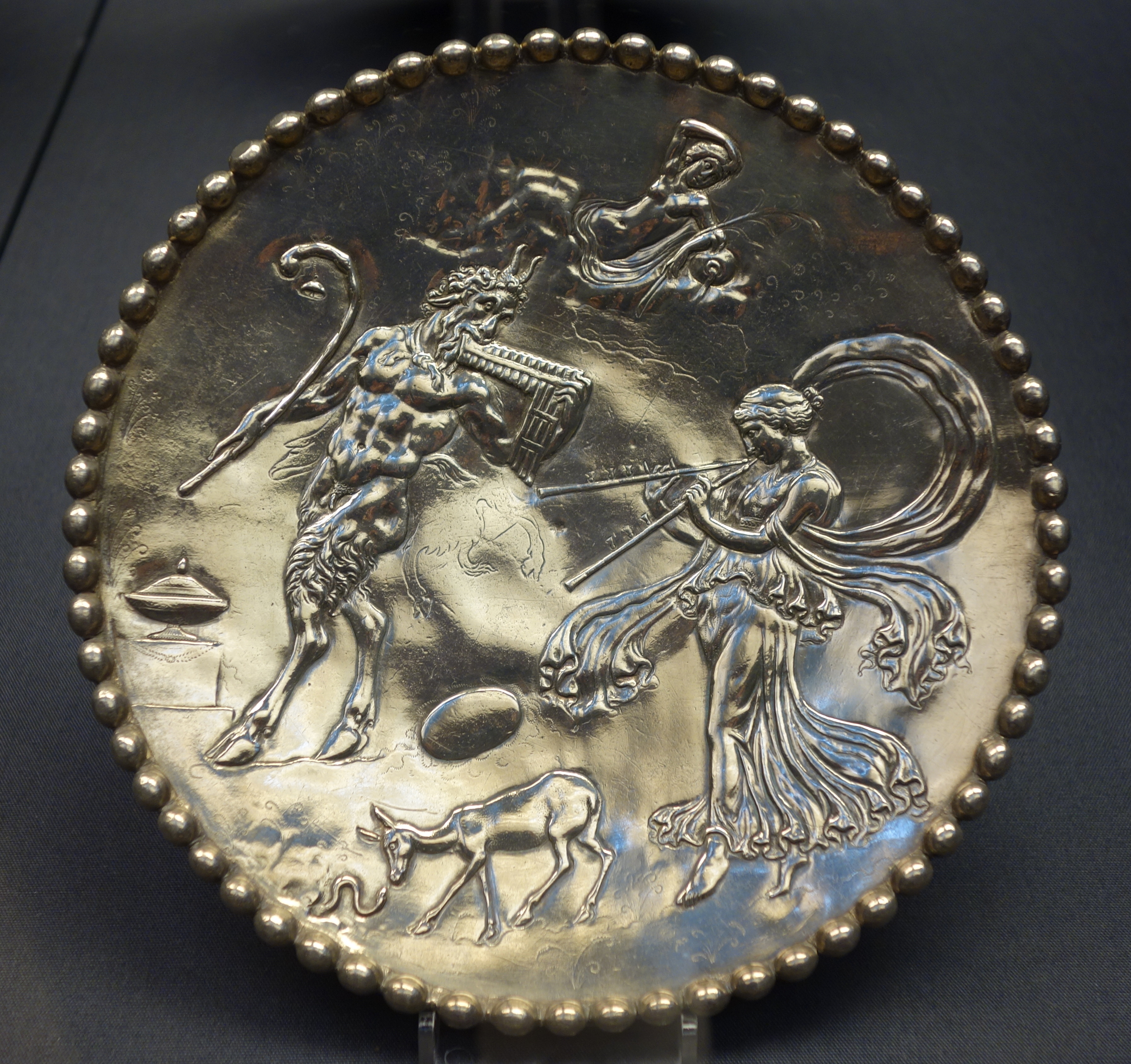
4th century A.D., England. Woman playing tibia, beside Pan (playing panpipes). Bacchic artwork found buried in Mildenhall.

== Tibia impares, double reedpipe ==
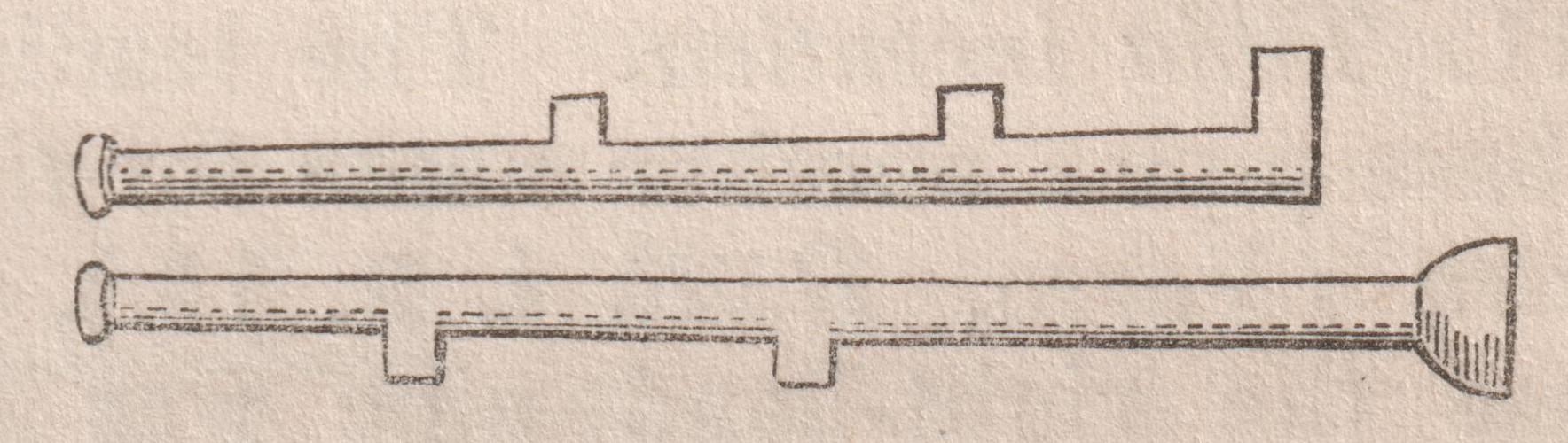
Tibiae impares were two pipes of different lengths, the longer Tibia dextra creating bass notes, the shorter Tibia sinistra producing treble notes.

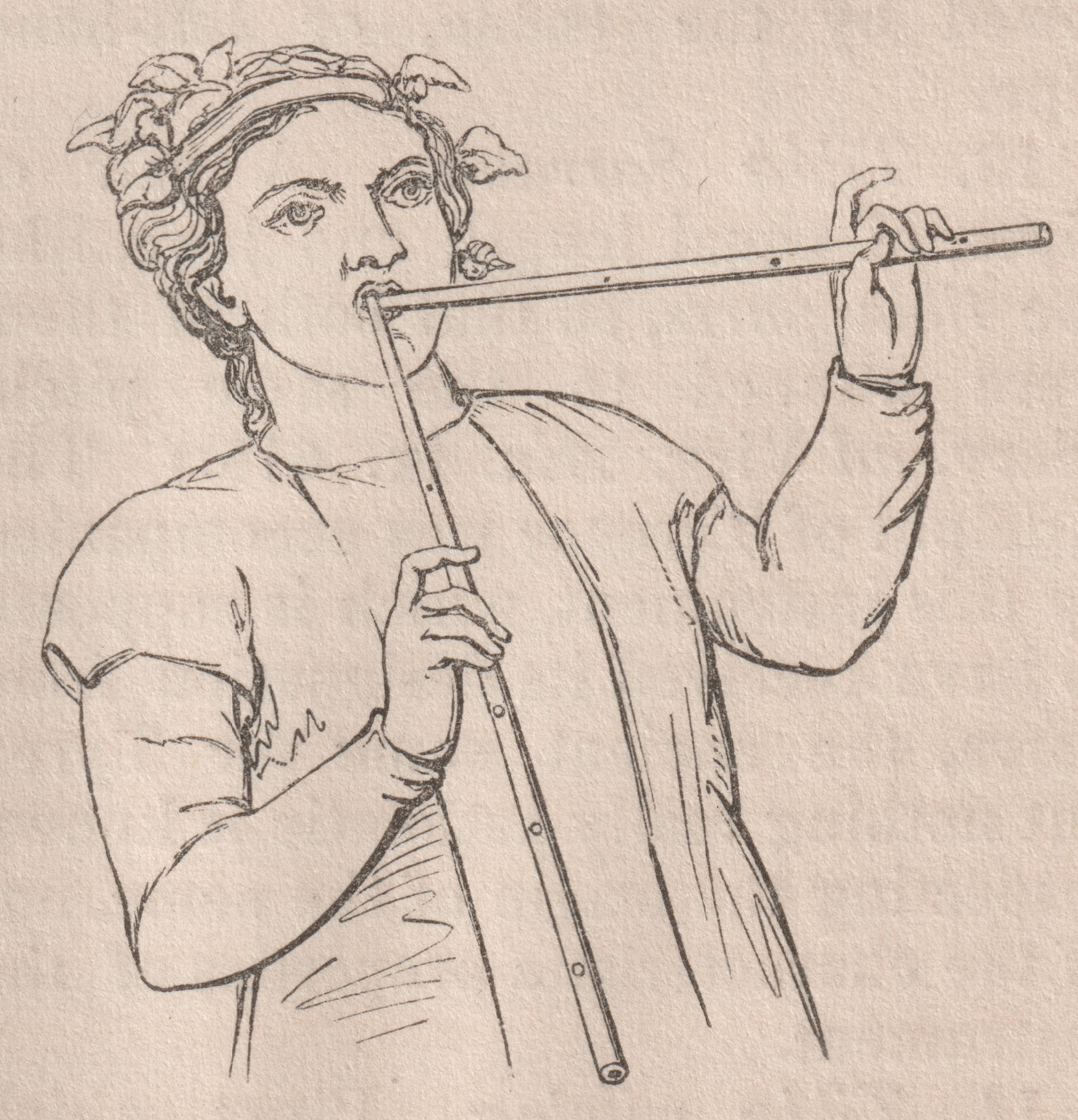
Tibia dextra (αὐλός ἀνδρήϊος), the bass pipe held in the player's right hand, "made from the upper part of the reed or cane." Tibia sinistra (αὐλός γυναικειος), the treble pipe held in the player's left hand, "made of the lower part of the reed or cane near the roots," produced sharp or treble notes (acuto tinnitu).

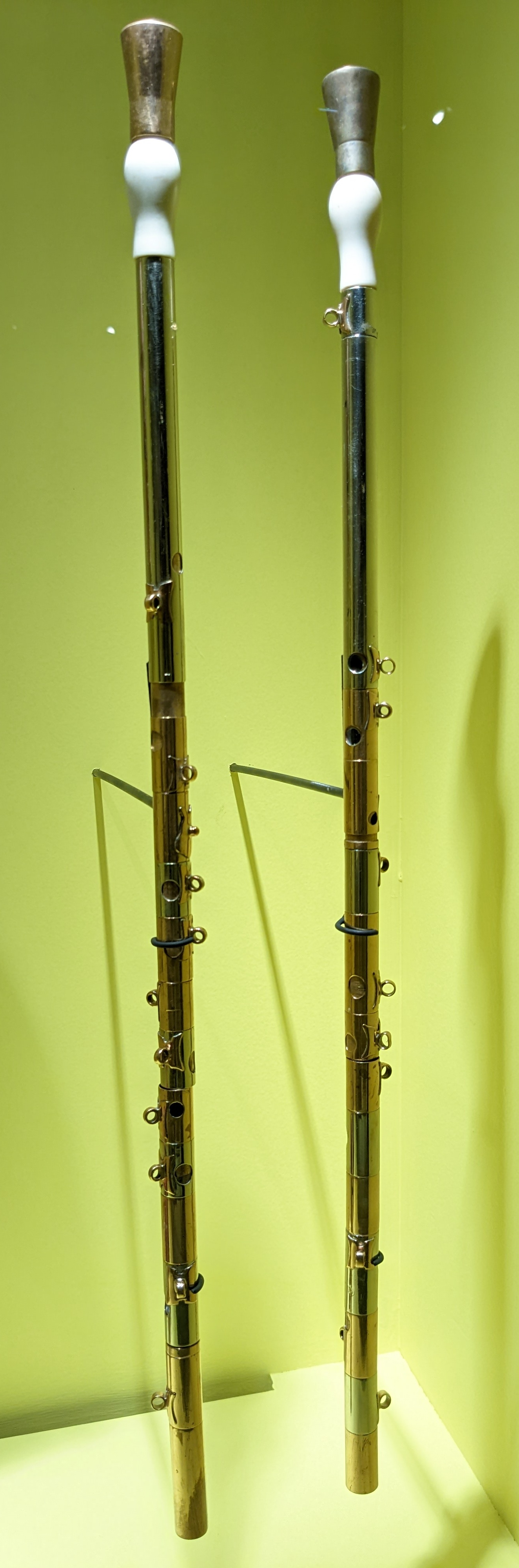
Recreation of tibia pipes of slightly different lengths.

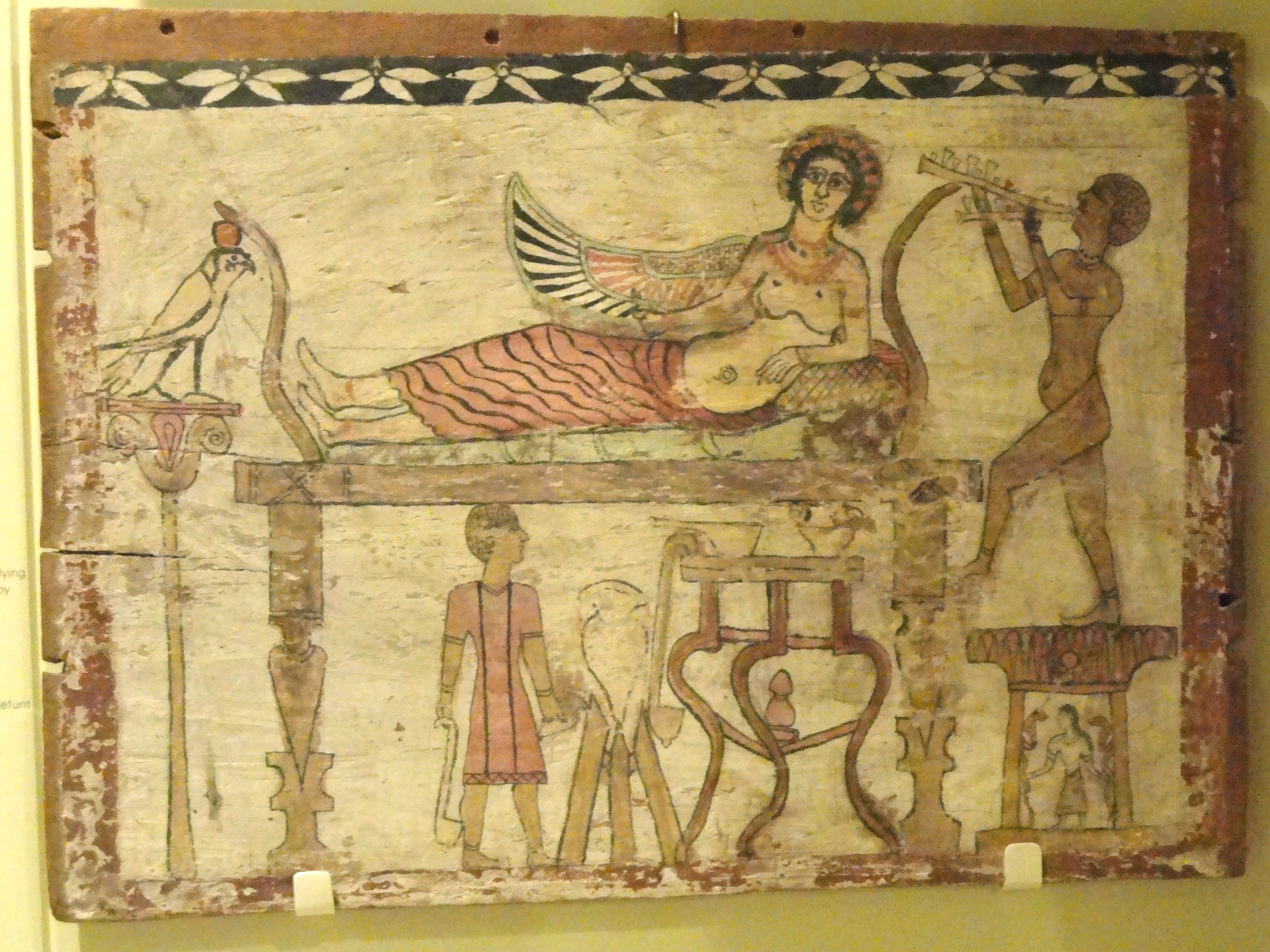
30 B.C. - 324 A.D. (Roman period in Egypt). Reedpipes of unequal length. Tibicen performing for Isis in funerary art from Roman Egypt (Royal Ontario Museum, Toronto).

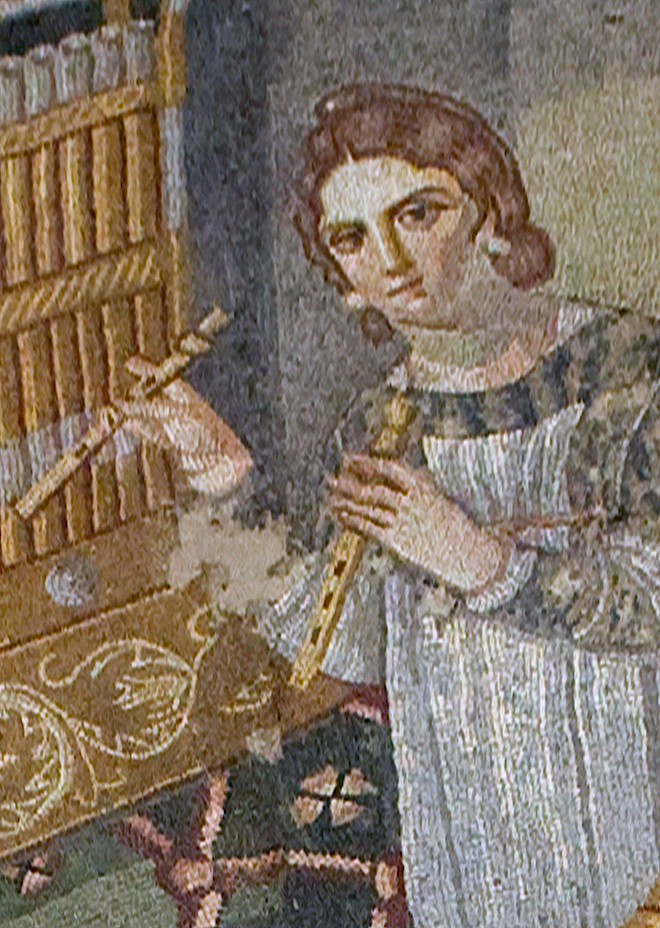
4th century A.D., Mariamin, Syria (part of Byzantine Empire). Tibia, from the Mosaic of the Female Musicians, Mariamin

== Tibia obliqua, tibia vasca, reedpipe ==
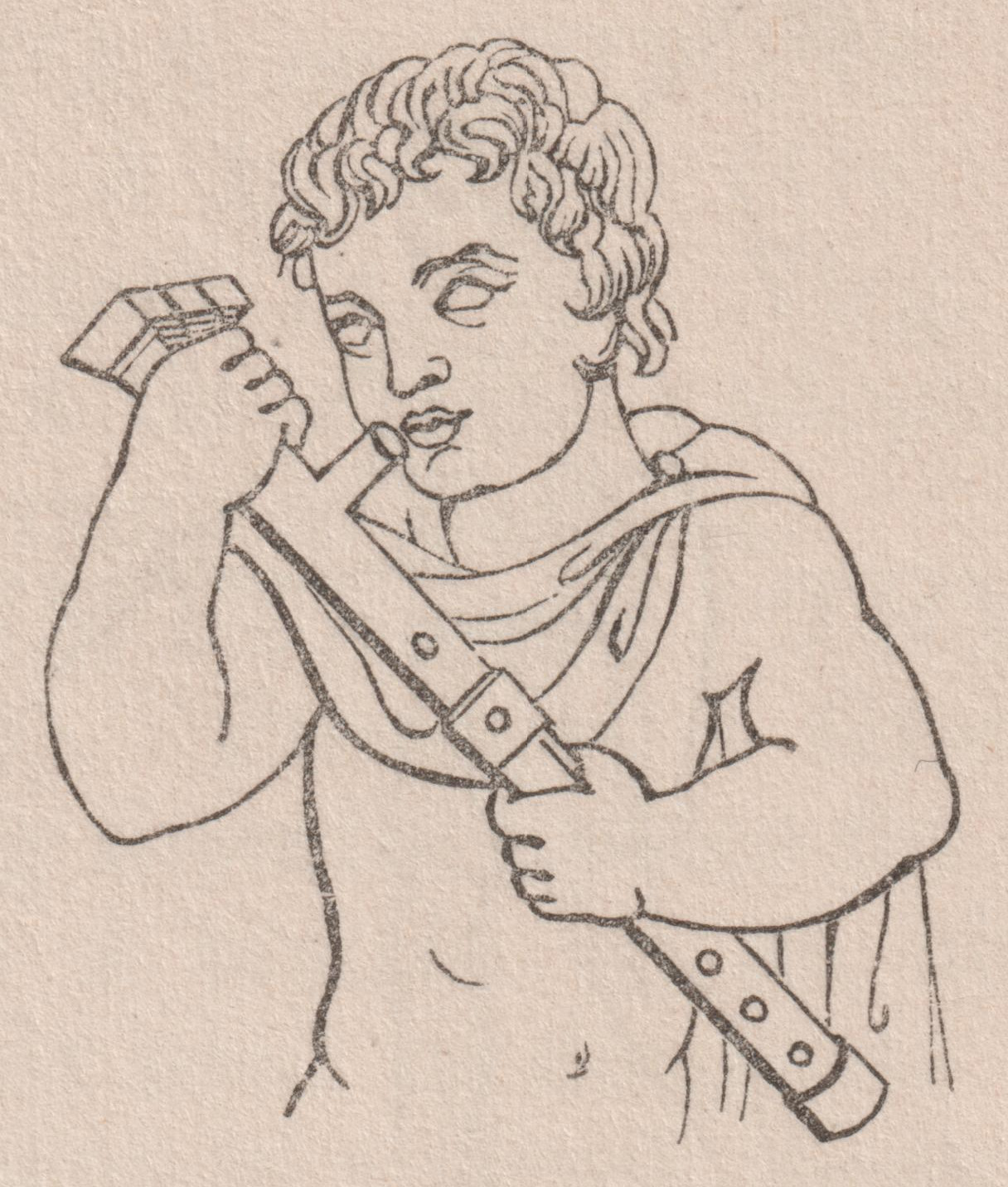
Tibia obliqua (πλαγίαυλος). Reeds inserted on side of pipe like bassoon. Illustration from a bas-relief in the Vatican.

100 BC–200 AD?, Rome. Tibia obliqua. Double reed, bone body, 1 foot 2 inches long, Metropolitan Museum of Art, The Crosby Brown Collection of Musical Instruments, 1889, object Number: 89.4.1797

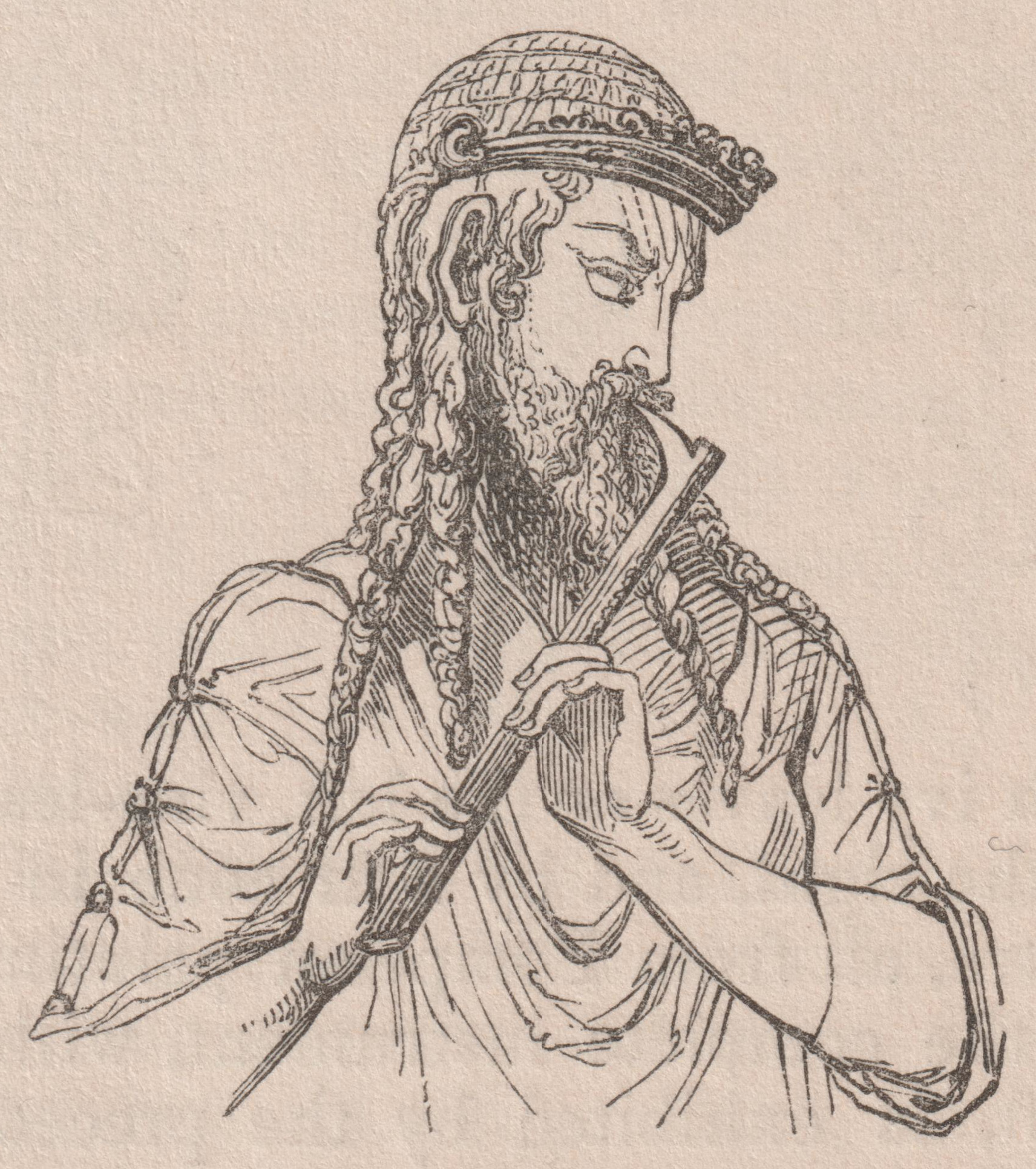
Tibia vasca. Like the tibia obliqua but shorter, body made from reed or cane, mouthpiece perpendicular to body at the end, reed mouthpiece shaped to modulate tones.

== Monaulos ==
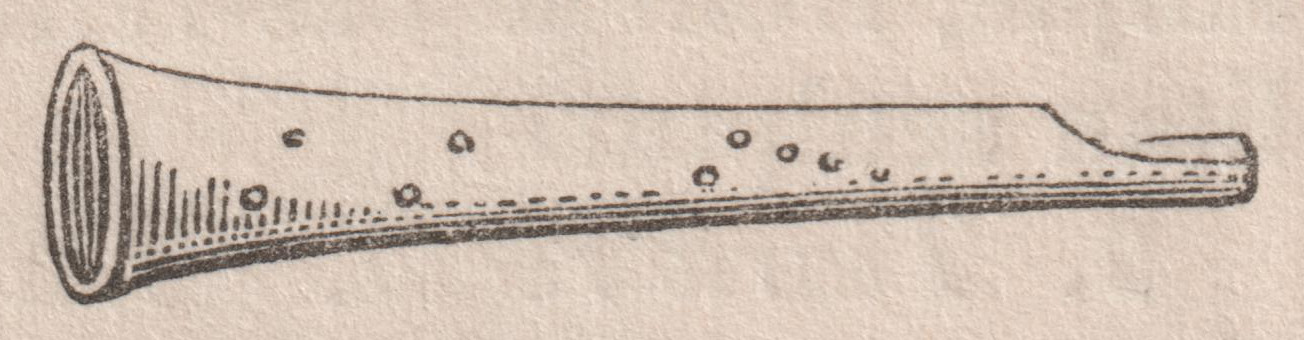
Monaulos (μοναυλος) single aulos. Played in Ptolemaic Egypt. Possibly this was a duct flute, "something like the modern flageolet."

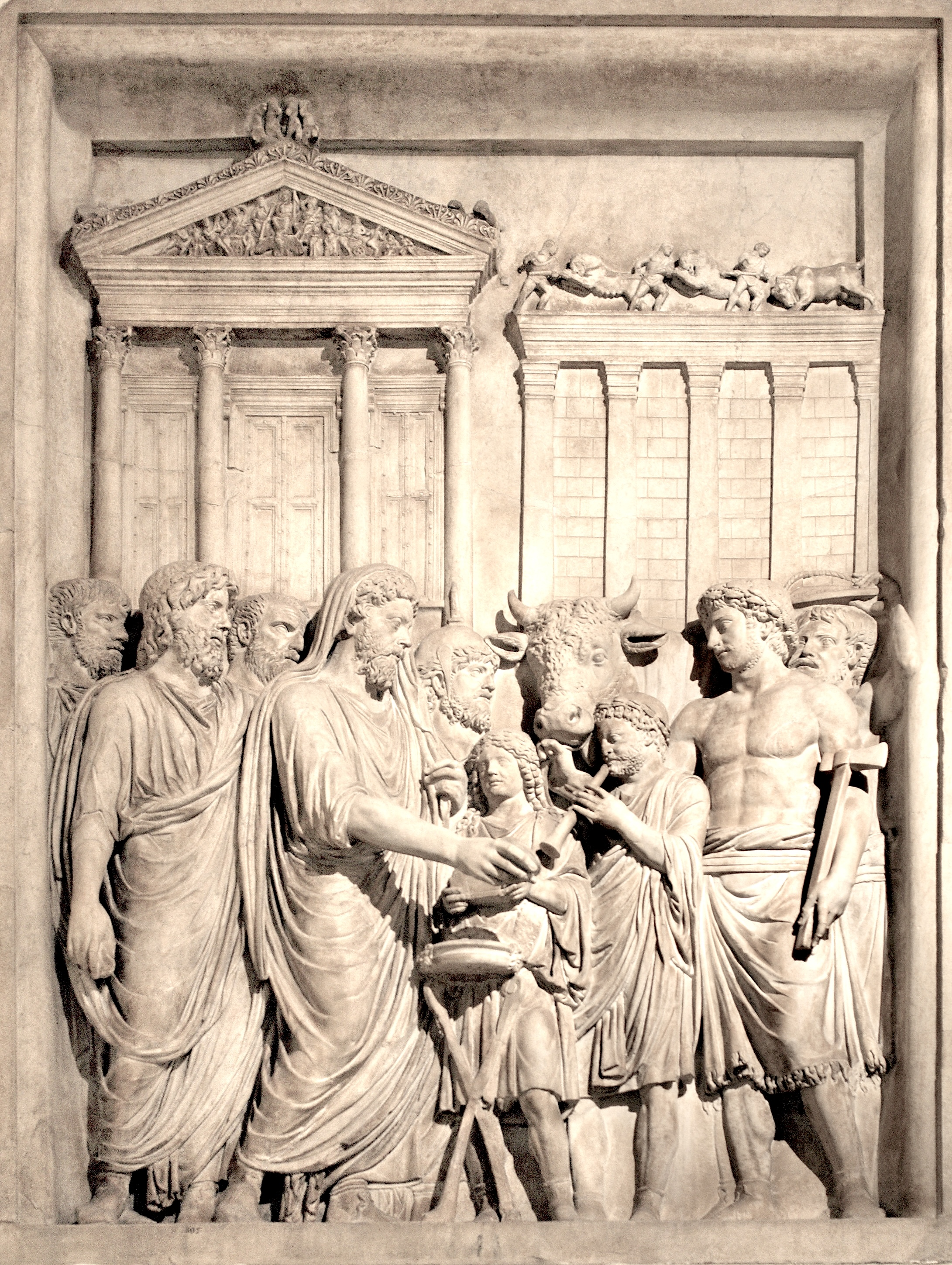
Tibia player in scene of Bas relief from Arch of Marcus Aurelius showing sacrifice

== Other tibia ==
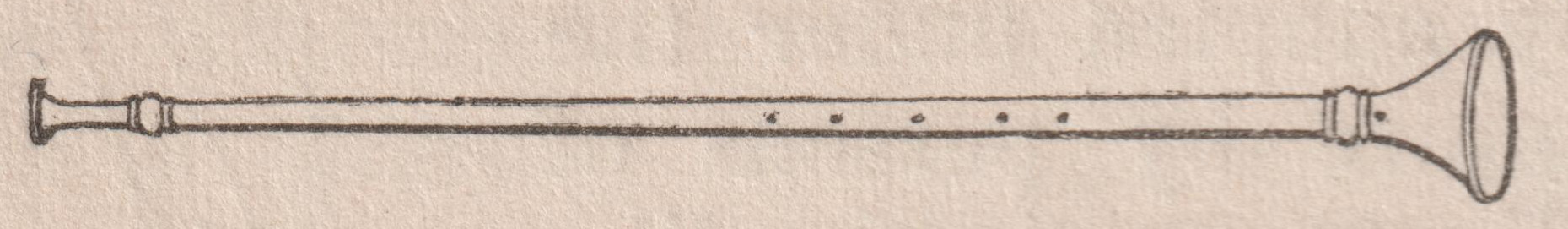
Tibia longa. Illustrated with an apparent trumpet mouthpiece (which would make it a tuba), that could also be the holder for a double-reed bundle. Instruments could be as long as the musicians. "Employed in religious ceremonies, in the temples, and at the sacrifice, to emit a loud and solemn strain during libations."

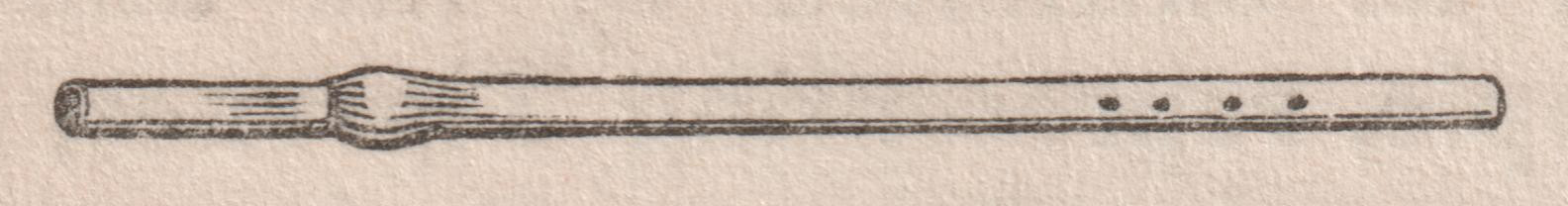
Tibia gingrina (γίγγρας) or gingras, simple reed pipe (single reed), shrill note like a fife, used in Phoenicia and Egypt. Egyptian tomb discoveries are 9 to 18 inches in length.

== Classes of tibia-playing musicians ==
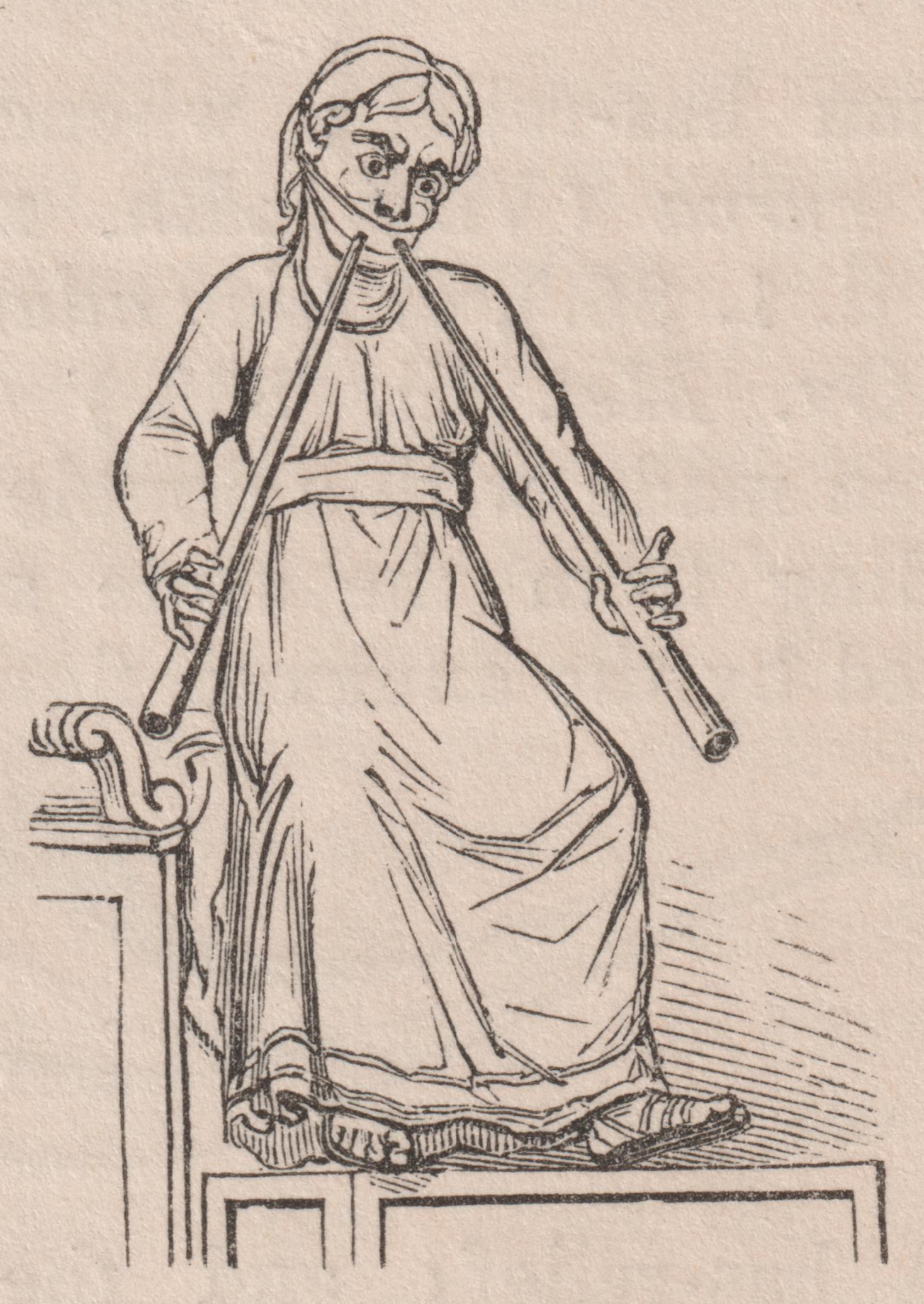
Tibi'cen (αὐλητης), tibia pipers, formed professional corporation, played at festivals and religious "solemnities." The musician wears a capistrum (also called phorbeiá and peristomion), a band that covered the musician's mouth and cheeks; the band supported the musician's cheeks as he breathed through the nose (pushing air through his cheeks, even as he breathed in).

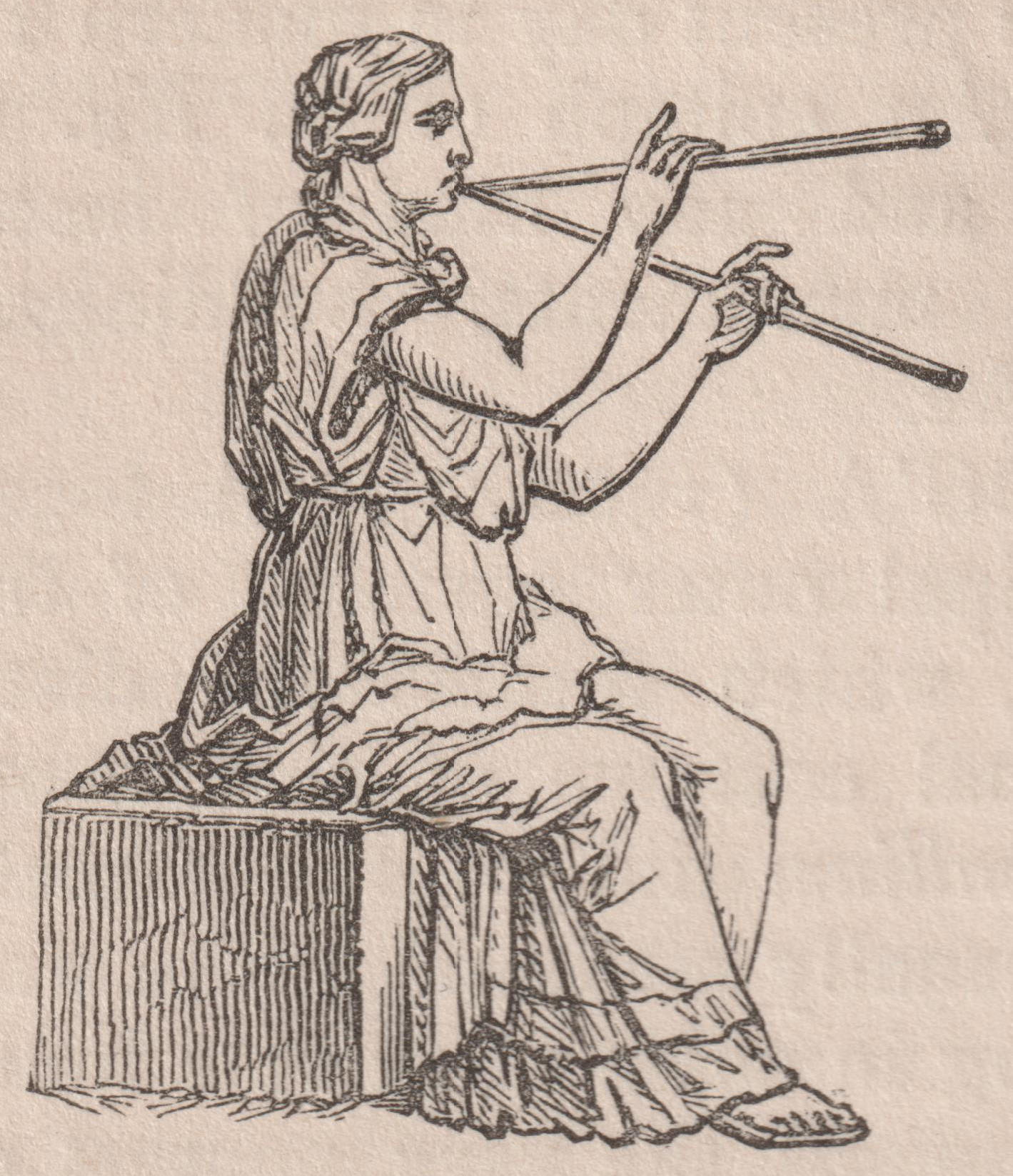
Tibi'cina (αὐλητρίς), female pipers, hired for "dinner parties and festive entertainments."

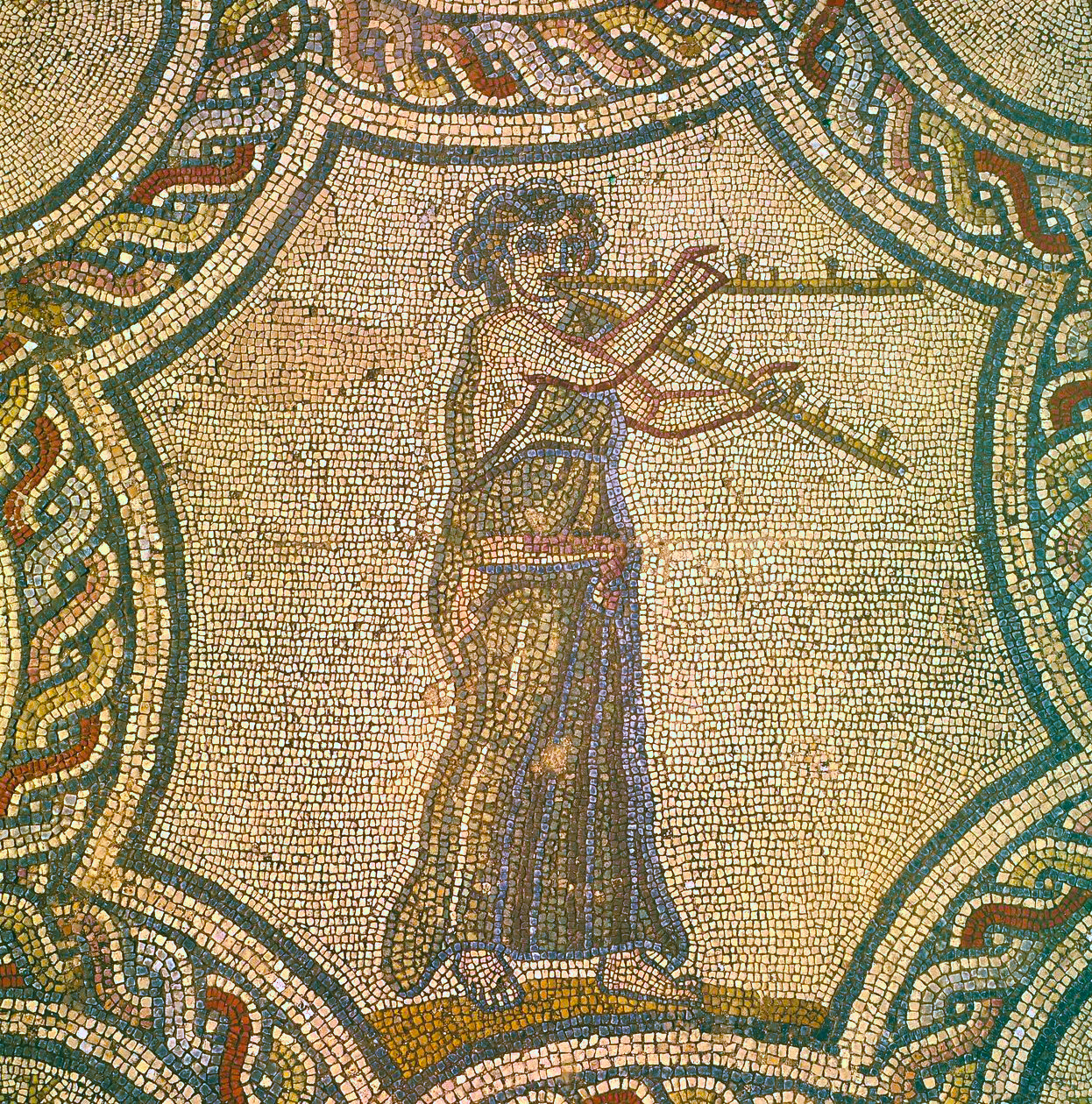
3rd century A.D. Mosaic depicting Tibi'cina or maenad from the House of Dionysus in Volubilis Morocco, part of the Roman Empire.

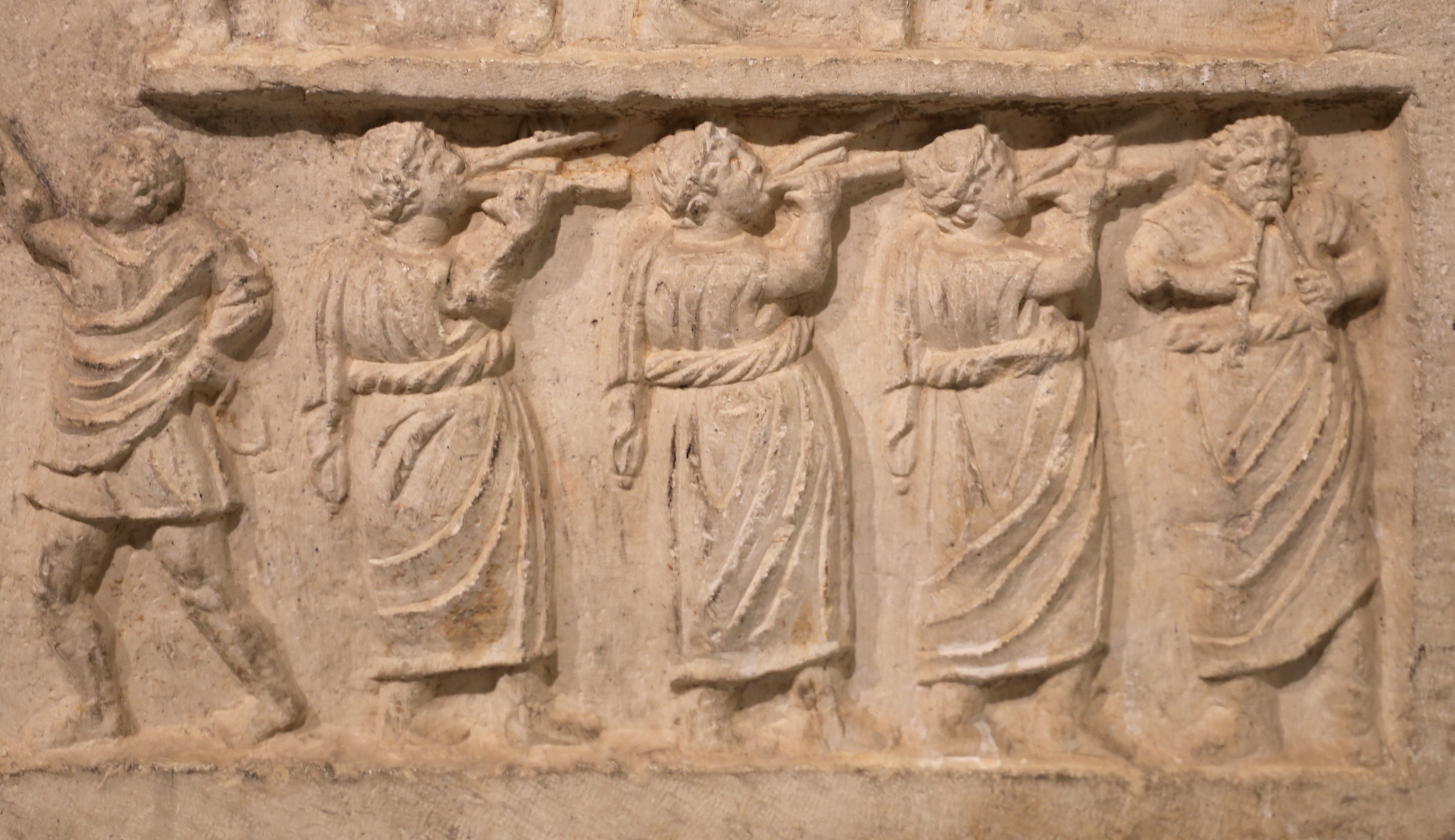
Late 1st century B.C. - early 1st century A.D., Amiternum, Tibicens playing in procession.

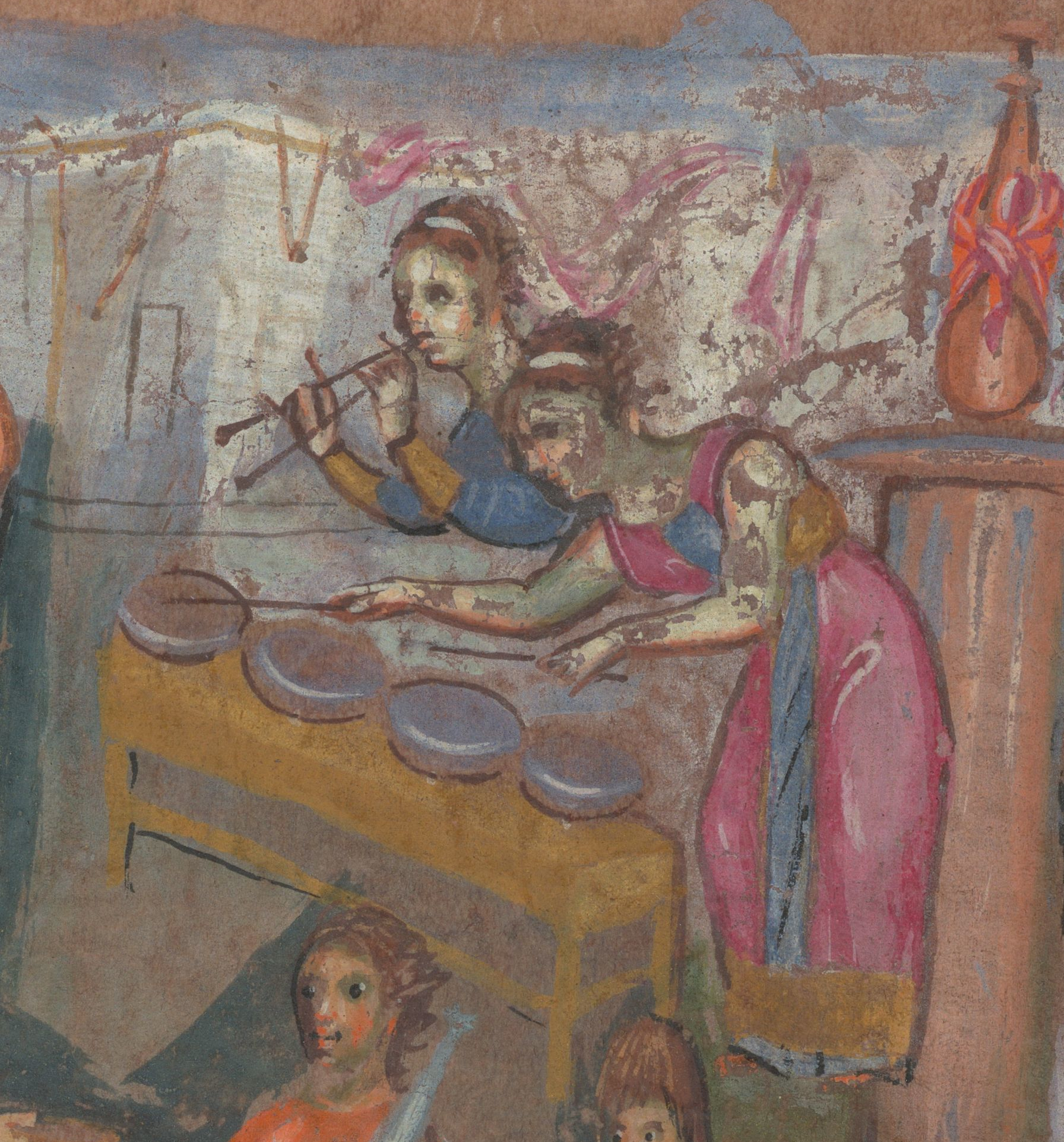
6th century A.D., Roman Syria. Musicians entertaining at a party with tibia and oksivafon (metallic bowls struck as bells).
