= Gingras (instrument) =

Phoenician flute

Gingra/Gingri
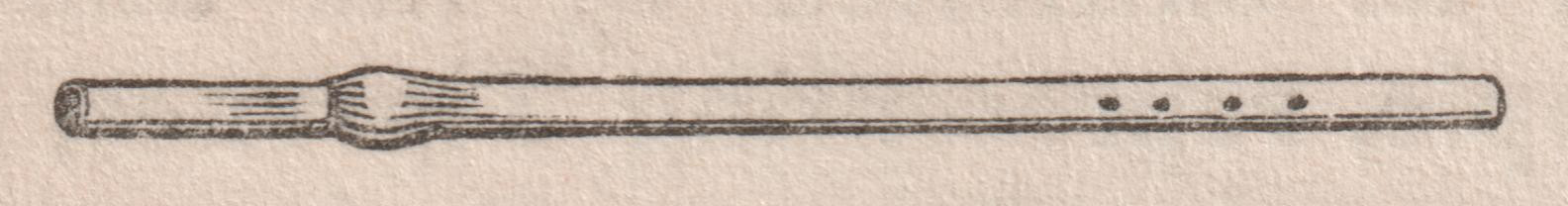
- Tibia gingrina (γίγγρας) or gingras, simple reed pipe (single reed), shrill note like a fife, used in Phoenicia and Egypt. Egyptian tomb discoveries are 9 to 18 inches in length.

Woodwind instrument
- Classification: woodwind

Gingras (alternatively Gingra and Gingri) was a type of flute used by the Phoenicians, particularly in their mourning rituals. Information about the gingras comes from second-century AD Greek rhetorician Athenaeus in his work The Deipnosophists, where he reports the accounts of Xenophon, Democleides, Corinna, Bacchylides, Antiphanes, Menander, Amphis, and Axionicus about the instrument and its sound.

== Description and use ==
Described by Xenophon as about 9 inches (23 centimetres) long, the gingras was a wind instrument that produced a "shrill and mournful tone". (Note: According to another translation the Gingras tone is described as "high-pitched and plaintive".) According to Democleides, the name "gingri" is derived from the lamentations for Adonis, as the Phoenicians referred to their god as " Adonis Gingres". Amphis describes the gingras as a new invention of the Phoenicians. According to Athenaeus the instrument is also mentioned by fifth-century BC lyricists Corinna and Bacchylides, by fourth-century BC poet Antiphanes in his work "The Physician", and by late fourth-century BC Athenian poets Menander in "Karine" and Amphis in "Dithyrambos". The Gingras is also believed to have been used by the Carians in their lamentations.

== Ancient sources ==
Athenaeus reports the following ancient snippets mentioning the gingras. In "Phileuripides", Axionicus compares the love for the melodious strains of Euripides to an illness, stating that to those afflicted, every other music seems as "shrill as the gingras and a mere misfortune".

For they are both so sick with love
Of the melodious strains of soft Euripides,
That every other music seems to them
Shrill as the gingras and a mere misfortune.

— Phileuripides by Axionicus, in Athenaeus, Deipnosophistae 4.174, Translated by Charles Duke Yonge (1854)

In another passage from Dithyrambos by Amphis, a character says that he has acquired an excellent gingras, a new musical instrument. Although it has never been presented in any theater, he asserts that it is a luxury enjoyed at Athenian banquets. When asked why he does not introduce it to everyone, the character explains that he fears drawing an over-enthusiastic audience, as they would disrupt everything with their applause.

(A) And I have got that admirable gingras.
(B) What is the gingras?
(A) 'Tis a new invention
Of our countrymen, which never yet
Has been exhibited in any theatre,
But is a luxury of Athenian banquets.
(B) Why then not introduce it to this people?
(A) Because I think that I shall draw by lot
Some most ambitious tribe; for well I know
They would disturb all things with their applause.

— Dithyrambos by Amphis, in Athenaeus, Deipnosophistae 4.174, Translated by Charles Duke Yonge (1854)

In Book IV of his second-century AD Onomasticon, the Greek grammarian and sophist Julius Pollux provides a dedicated entry on the gingras, defining it as a small pipe (aulisko) fitted with a small reed (glotta) that produced a high-pitched, mournful sound. Pollux notes that the instrument was credited as a Phoenician invention, was used to accompany Carian music, and was sometimes called oxykampyles ("sharp-curved"). He likewise connects its name with laments for Adonis, adding that the Phoenicians referred to Adonis himself by the name Gingras.

γίγγρας δέ τις μικρός ἐστιν αὐλίσκος, θρηνητικὸν ἦχον ἀφιείς, Φοίνιξι μὲν τὴν εὕρεσιν παρέχων, ἐπὶ δὲ τῇ Καρικῇ Μούσῃ αὐλούμενος. γλῶττα δ' αὐτῷ ἐστι μικρά, καὶ ὁ ἦχος ὀξύς· ἐκαλεῖτο δὲ ὀξυκαμπύλης. ὠνόμασαν δὲ αὐτὸν ἀπὸ τῶν θρήνων τῶν ἐπὶ Ἀδώνιδι, Φοίνικες γὰρ τὸν Ἀδωνιν γίγγραν καλοῦσιν.
Σκύθαι δὲ ἐλάφων κέρασιν αὐλοῦσιν, Ἀνδροφάγοι δὲ καὶ Μελάγχλαινοι καὶ Ἀριμασποὶ ὀστέοις.

— Julius Pollux, in Onomasticon IV, 76

== See also ==
- Cinyra
- Nabla – Musical instrument
- Phoinix – Ancient Phoenician stringed instrument
