= Nabla symbol =

Symbol used to indicate the del operator

∇
The nabla symbol

The nabla is a triangular symbol resembling an inverted Greek delta: (Note: Indeed, it is called anadelta (ανάδελτα) in Modern Greek.) $\nabla$ or ∇. The name comes, by reason of the symbol's shape, from the Hellenistic Greek word νάβλα for a Phoenician harp, and was suggested by the encyclopedist William Robertson Smith in an 1870 letter to Peter Guthrie Tait.

The nabla symbol is available in standard HTML as &nabla; and in LaTeX as \nabla. In Unicode, it is the character at code point U+2207, or 8711 in decimal notation, in the Mathematical Operators block.

As a mathematical operator, it is often called del.

== History ==
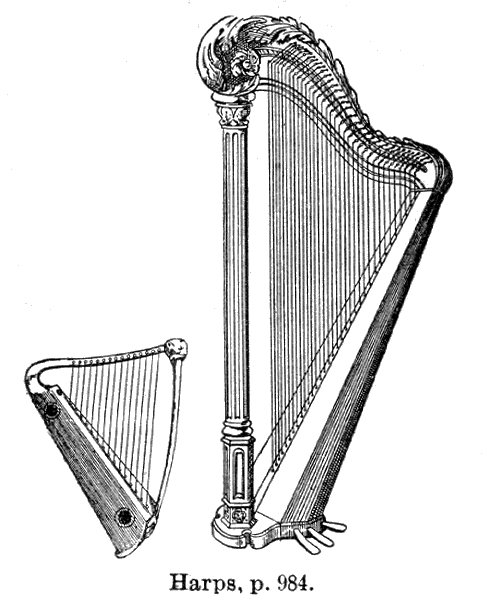
The harp, the instrument after which the nabla symbol is named

The differential operator given in Cartesian coordinates $\{x,y,z\}$ on three-dimensional Euclidean space by

$$\mathbf{i}\frac{\partial}{\partial x} + \mathbf{j}\frac{\partial}{\partial y} + \mathbf{k}\frac{\partial}{\partial z}$$

was introduced in 1831 by the Irish mathematician and physicist William Rowan Hamilton, who called it ◁. (The unit vectors $\{\mathbf{i},\mathbf{j},\mathbf{k}\}$ were originally right versors in Hamilton's quaternions.) The mathematics of ∇ received its full exposition at the hands of P. G. Tait.

After receiving Smith's suggestion, Tait and James Clerk Maxwell referred to the operator as nabla in their extensive private correspondence; most of these references are of a humorous character. C. G. Knott's Life and Scientific Work of Peter Guthrie Tait (p. 145):

It was probably this reluctance on the part of Maxwell to use the term Nabla in serious writings which prevented Tait from introducing the word earlier than he did. The one published use of the word by Maxwell is in the title to his humorous Tyndallic Ode, which is dedicated to the "Chief Musician upon Nabla", that is, Tait.

William Thomson (Lord Kelvin) introduced the term to an American audience in an 1884 lecture; the notes were published in Britain and the U.S. in 1904.

The name is acknowledged, and criticized, by Oliver Heaviside in 1891:

The fictitious vector ∇ given by

$$\nabla = \mathbf{i}\nabla_1 + \mathbf{j}\nabla_2 + \mathbf{k}\nabla_3 = \mathbf{i}\frac{d}{dx} + \mathbf{j}\frac{d}{dy} + \mathbf{k}\frac{d}{dz}$$

is very important. Physical mathematics is very largely the mathematics of ∇. The name Nabla seems, therefore, ludicrously inefficient.

Heaviside and Josiah Willard Gibbs (independently) are credited with the development of the version of vector calculus most popular today.

The influential 1901 text Vector Analysis, written by Edwin Bidwell Wilson and based on the lectures of Gibbs, advocates the name "del":

This symbolic operator ∇ was introduced by Sir W. R. Hamilton and is now in universal employment. There seems, however, to be no universally recognized name for it, although owing to the frequent occurrence of the symbol some name is a practical necessity. It has been found by experience that the monosyllable del is so short and easy to pronounce that even in complicated formulae in which ∇ occurs a number of times, no inconvenience to the speaker or listener arises from the repetition. ∇V is read simply as "del V".

This book is responsible for the form in which the mathematics of the operator in question is now usually expressed—most notably in undergraduate physics, and especially electrodynamics, textbooks.

== Modern uses ==
The nabla is used in vector calculus as part of three distinct differential operators: the gradient (∇), the divergence (∇⋅), and the curl (∇×). The last of these uses the cross product and thus makes sense only in three dimensions; the first two are fully general. They were all originally studied in the context of the classical theory of electromagnetism, and contemporary university physics curricula typically treat the material using approximately the concepts and notation found in Gibbs and Wilson's Vector Analysis.

The symbol is also used in differential geometry to denote a connection.

A symbol of the same form, though presumably not genealogically related, appears in other areas, e.g.:

- As the all relation, particularly in lattice theory.
- As the backward difference operator, in the calculus of finite differences.
- As the widening operator, an operator that permits static analysis of programs to terminate in finite time, in the computer science field of abstract interpretation.
- As function definition marker and self-reference (recursion) in the APL programming language.
- As an indicator of indeterminacy in philosophical logic. (Note: For example, in Anthony Everett (2013), The Nonexistent, p. 210: We can represent cases of this form, cases where it is indeterminate whether in fiction f: a=b, as follows: $$(A) \nabla[^f a = b]^f.$$ Here, the brackets and superscript fs together serve to denote fictitiousness; thus the nabla says "It is indeterminate whether", and the rest says "a=b (fictively).")
- In naval architecture (ship design) and ship’s stability calculation, to represent the volume displacement of a ship or any other waterborne vessel, usually in m³; the graphically similar looking delta is used to represent weight displacement (the total weight of water displaced by the ship, usually in tons), thus $\nabla = \Delta/\rho$ where $\rho$ is the density of the seawater.
- In London Underground Working Timetables, to denote that the operator of the train carries out the Stepping Back procedure.

== See also ==
- Covariant derivative, also known as connection
- Del, treating the mathematics of the vector differential operator
- Del in cylindrical and spherical coordinates
- Dirac operator
- grad, div, and curl, differential operators defined using nabla
- History of quaternions
- Nevel
- Notation for differentiation
