= Kinnor =

Ancient Israelite musical instrument

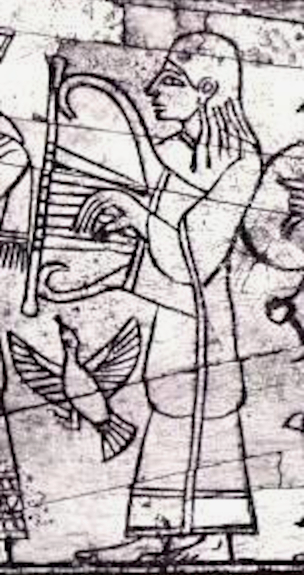
- Tel Megiddo, a lyre player 1350-1150 BC, identified as a likely kinnor by scholars. During the Iron Age, Megiddo was a royal city in the Kingdom of Israel.
- Other names: harp of David, from Hebrew kinnor Dávid
- Classification: String instrument

Related instruments
- Kithara, Lyre; Nevel, Harp

Kinnor (Hebrew: כִּנּוֹר kīnnōr) is an ancient Israelite musical instrument in the yoke lutes family, the first one to be mentioned in the Hebrew Bible.

Its exact identification is unclear, but in the modern day it is generally translated as "harp" or "lyre", and associated with a type of lyre depicted in Israelite imagery, particularly the Bar Kokhba coins. It has been referred to as the "national instrument" of the Jewish people, and modern luthiers have created reproduction lyres of the kinnor based on this imagery.

The word has subsequently come to mean violin in Modern Hebrew.

== Identification ==
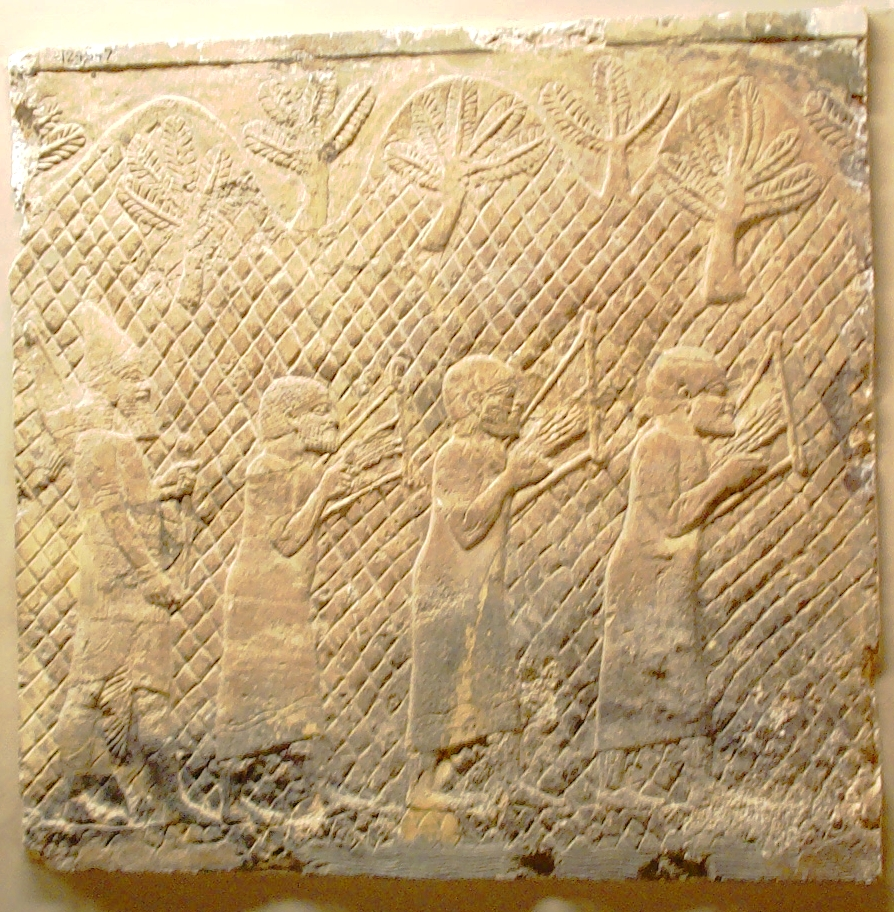
The most important visual source for the kinnor is a relief from Nineveh, on display at the British Museum: As the Judahite inhabitants of Lakhish are sent into exile in 701 BCE, they are forced to play the kinnor.

The kinnor is generally agreed to be a stringed instrument, and thus the stringed instrument most commonly mentioned in the Old Testament. The kinnor is also the first string instrument to be mentioned in the Bible, appearing in Genesis 4:21. It was also used in Egypt when Jacob's family settled there.

== Details ==
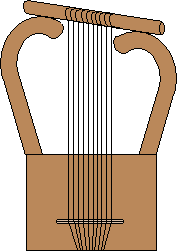
Schematic drawing of an ancient kinnor

=== Construction ===
Josephus describes the kinnor as having 10 strings, made from a sheep's small intestine, and played with a plectrum (pick), though the Book of Samuel notes that David played the kinnor "with his hand". The International Standard Bible Encyclopedia also notes that the early church fathers agreed the kithara (kinnor) had its resonator in the lower parts of its body. Like the nevel, the kinnor likely consisted of a soundboard with two arms extending parallel to the body, with the arms crossed by a yoke from which the strings extend down to the body.

One etymology of Kinneret, the Hebrew name of the Sea of Galilee, is that it derives from kinnor, on account of the shape of the lake resembling that of the instrument. If this etymology is correct it may be relevant to the question of the shape of the instrument.

=== Usage ===
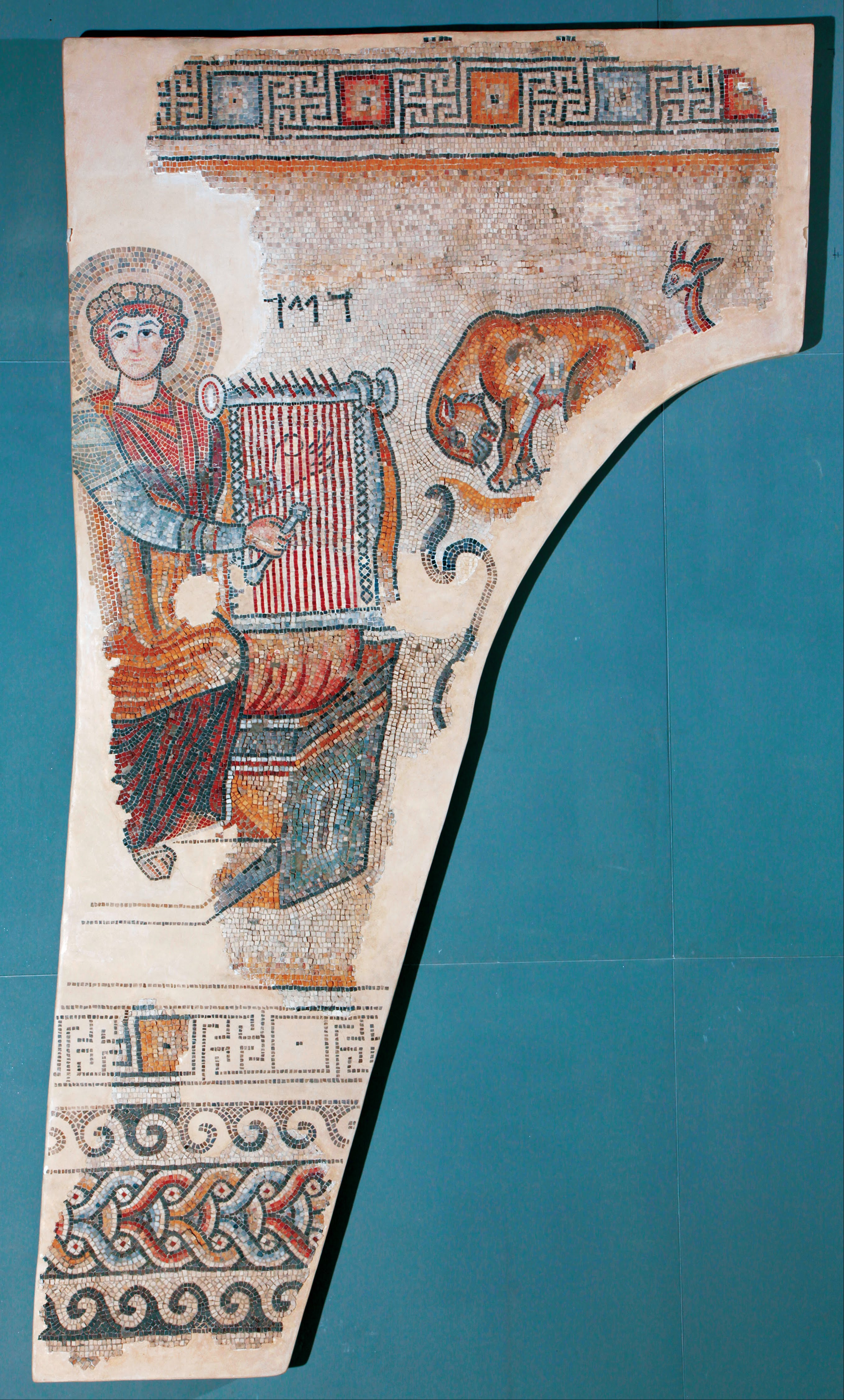
The nebel, a larger ancient harp, depicted in a mosaic, found in a 6th century A.D. synagogue in Gaza.

The kinnor is mentioned 42 times in the Old Testament, in relation to "divine worship ... prophecy ... secular festivals ... and prostitution." The kinnor is sometimes mentioned in conjunction with the nevel, which is also presumed to be a lyre but larger and louder than the kinnor. The Mishna states that the minimum number of kinnor to be played in the Temple is nine, with no maximum limit.

=== Use of the word in Modern Hebrew ===
The word כינור kinór is used in Modern Hebrew to signify the modern Western violin.

== See also ==
- Nevel
