= NABL =

NABL may refer to:

- National Alliance of Basketball Leagues, American organisation
- North American League (baseball), official name North American Baseball League, American organisation
- National Athletic Basketball League, defunct American basketball league
- North American Basketball League, American minor league basketball organization founded in 2016.
- National Accreditation Board for Testing and Calibration Laboratories an autonomous body under Department for Promotion of Industry and Internal Trade, Government of India

== See also ==
- Kafr Nabl, a city in Syria
