= Nambla =

Village in Baramula district, Jammu and Kashmir, India

- Village
- Location in Jammu and Kashmir, India Nambla (India)
- Coordinates: 34.0711°N 74.1089°E
- Country: India
- Union territory: Jammu and Kashmir
- District: Baramulla

Area
  - Total: 1,195 ha (2,950 acres)

Population (2011)
  - Total: 14,206
  - Density: 1,189/km^{2} (3,079/sq mi)

Languages
  - Official: Kashmiri, Urdu, Hindi, Dogri
- Time zone: UTC+5:30 (IST)
- PIN: 193123

Nambla is a census village in Baramula district, Jammu and Kashmir, India.

As per the 2011 Census of India, Nambla has a total population of 7,193 people including 3,688 males and 3,505 females with a literacy rate of 44.08%.
