= Nevel (instrument) =

Musical instrument

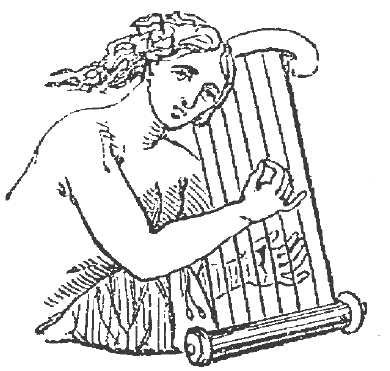
- Ancient Nevel (Harp) as imagined in 19th century woodcut
- Classification: String instrument

Related instruments
- Lyre, Kinnor, Kithara

The nevel, nebel (Hebrew: נֵבֶל nēḇel), was a stringed instrument used by the Phoenicians and the Israelites. The Greeks translated the name as nabla (νάβλα, "Phoenician harp").

A number of possibilities have been proposed for what kind of instrument the nevel was; these include the psaltery and the kithara, both of which are strummed instruments like the kinnor, with strings running across the sound box, like the modern guitar and zither. Most scholars believe the nevel was a frame harp, a plucked instrument with strings rising up from its sound box.

The King James Version renders the word into English as psaltery or viol, and the Book of Common Prayer renders it lute.

The word nevel has been adopted for "harp" in Modern Hebrew.

== In the Phoenician context ==
The nabla, mentioned by Athenaeus in his work "The Deipnosophists", is described as "an invention of the Phoenicians". He cites Sopater of Paphos who writes:

Nor is the noise of the Sidonian nablas ,
Which from the throat doth flow, at all impaired.

— Sopater of Paphos, Pylae

Atheneus reports that Mystacus described the nablas as an instrument of harmony, having a lotus fixed to its long sides. The instrument produces lively music that is not soft or sweet but rather merry, similar to singing in a Bacchic style:

Among the instruments of harmony
The nablas comes, not over soft or sweet;
By its long sides a lifeless lotus fixed
Sends forth a breathed music; and excites men,
Singing in Bacchic strain a merry song.

— The Salve by Mystacus, in Athenaeus, Deipnosophistae 4.174

Atheneus also copies Philemon's The Adulterer, where one of the play characters teases another character, Parmenon, for not knowing what a nablas is:

(A) There should, O Parmenon, be here among us
A nablas or a female flute-player.
(B) What is a nablas?
(A) Don't you know? you idiot!
(B) Indeed I don't.
(A) What, do not know a nablas?
You know no good; perhaps a sambuca-player
You never have heard of either!

— The Adulterer by Philemon, in Athenaeus, Deipnosophistae 4.174

== See also ==
- Lyres of Ur – Ancient musical instruments found in Iraq
- Nabla symbol – Symbol used to indicate the del operator
- Gingras (instrument) – Phoenician flute
