= Phoenix =

Phoenix most commonly refers to:

- Phoenix (mythology), an immortal bird in ancient Greek mythology
- Phoenix, Arizona, the capital and most populous city of Arizona

Phoenix may also refer to:

== Greek mythology ==
- Phoenix (Greek mythology), several other figures in Greek mythology, including:
  - Phoenix (son of Agenor), brother or father of Europa
  - Phoenix (son of Amyntor), king of the Dolopians who raises Achilles

== Places ==
=== Populated places ===
==== Canada ====
- Phoenix, Alberta, a ghost town
- Phoenix, British Columbia, a ghost town

==== United States ====
- Phoenix metropolitan area, Arizona
- Phoenix, Georgia, an unincorporated community
- Phoenix, Illinois, a village
- Phoenix, Louisiana, an unincorporated community
- Phoenix, Maryland, an unincorporated community
- Phoenix, Michigan, an unincorporated community
- Phoenix, Mississippi, an unincorporated community
- Phoenix, Edison, New Jersey, a neighborhood of the township of Edison
- Phoenix, Sayreville, New Jersey, a neighborhood of the borough of Sayreville
- Phoenix, New York, a village
- Phoenix, Oregon, a city

==== Elsewhere ====
- Phoenix (Caria), a town of ancient Caria, now in Turkey
- Phoenix City, a nickname for Warsaw, the capital of Poland
- Phoenix (Crete), a town of ancient Crete mentioned in the Bible
- Phoenix Islands, in the Republic of Kiribati
- Phoenix, KwaZulu-Natal, in South Africa
- Phoenix (Lycia), a town of ancient Lycia, now in Turkey

=== Rivers ===
- Phoenix (Aegium), of ancient Greece, subsequently known as the Foinikas, in Peloponnesus
- Phoenix (river) (Thessaly), a small river of ancient Greece, that flowed into the Asopus river

=== Other places ===
- Phoenix Inn, a pub in York, England
- Phoenix LRT station, Singapore
- Phoenix Park, Dublin, Ireland, an urban park

== Arts and entertainment ==
=== Fictional entities ===
==== Characters ====
- Phoenix (comics), alias used by several comics characters
- Phoenix Force, a Marvel Comics entity
- Jean Grey, also known as Phoenix and Dark Phoenix, an X-Men character
- Rachel Summers, a Marvel Comics character also known as Phoenix
- Phoenix (Transformers)
- Phoenix Hathaway, in the British soap opera Hollyoaks
- Phoenix Raynor, a Shortland Street character
- Phoenix Wright, an Ace Attorney character
- Aster Phoenix (also known as Edo Phoenix), a Yu-Gi-Oh! GX character
- Paul Phoenix (Tekken), a Tekken character
- Simon Phoenix, a Demolition Man character
- Stefano DiMera, also known as The Phoenix, a Days of our Lives character
- Phoenix, female protagonist of the film Phantom of the Paradise, played by Jessica Harper
- Phoenix Buchanan, a fictional actor and the main antagonist of Paddington 2
- Phoenix Jackson, female protagonist of "A Worn Path" by Eudora Welty

==== Organizations ====
- Phoenix Foundation (MacGyver)
- Phoenix Organization, in John Doe
- Order of the Phoenix (fictional organisation), a secret society in Harry Potter

==== Vessels ====
- Phoenix (Star Trek), a spacecraft

=== Film ===
- Fushichō (English: Phoenix), 1947, by Keisuke Kinoshita
- The Phoenix (1959 film), by Robert Aldrich
- Phoenix (1978 film), a jidaigeki film by Kon Ichikawa
- Phoenix (1998 film), a crime film by Danny Cannon
- Phoenix (2006 film), a gay-related film by Michael Akers
- Phoenix (2014 film), by Christian Petzold
- The Phoenix (Simorgh; 2015), a short film by Noora Niasari
- Phoenix (2023 film), a Malayalam film
- Phoenix (2025 film), a Tamil film
- Phoenixes (film), a 2024 Canadian film by Jonathan Beaulieu-Cyr

=== Literature ===
==== Books ====
- Phoenix: The Posthumous Papers of D. H. Lawrence (1885–1930), an anthology of work by D. H. Lawrence
- Phoenix (novel), by Stephen Brust
- The Phoenix (novel), by Henning Boëtius
- Phoenix IV: The History of the Videogame Industry, by Leonard Herman

==== Comics ====
- Phoenix (manga) (Hi no Tori), by Osamu Tezuka
- The Phoenix (comics), a weekly British comics anthology

==== Periodicals ====
- Star-Phoenix, Saskatoon, Saskatchewan
- The Phoenix (magazine), Ireland
- The Phoenix (newspaper), US
- Phoenix (classics journal), originally The Phoenix, a journal of the Classical Association of Canada
- Project Phoenix, codename of the aborted BBC Newsbrief magazine
- List of periodicals named Phoenix
- The Swarthmore Phoenix, a weekly student newspaper at Swarthmore College

==== Other literature ====
- The Phoenix (play), by Thomas Middleton
- The Phoenix (Old English poem)
- The Phoenix, a play by Morgan Spurlock
- The Phoenix, a Latin poem attributed to Lactantius

=== Music ===
==== Musicians ====
- Phoenix (French band), a French alternative rock band
- Phoenix (Romanian band), Romanian rock band
- Dave Farrell (born 1977), stage name Phoenix, American bass guitarist in the band Linkin Park

==== Albums ====
- Phoenix (Agathodaimon album)
- Phoenix (Asia album)
- Phoenix (Vince Bell album)
- Phoenix, a 2003 EP by Breaking Pangaea
- Phoenix (Charlotte Cardin album)
- Phoenix (Carpark North album)
- The Phoenix (CKY album)
- Phoenix (Clan of Xymox album)
- Phoenix (Classic Crime album)
- Phoenix (Dreamtale album)
- Phoenix (Emil Bulls album)
- Phoenix (Everything in Slow Motion album)
- The Phoenix (EP), by Flipsyde
- Phoenix (Dan Fogelberg album)
- Phoenix (Grand Funk Railroad album)
- Phoenix: The Very Best of InMe, a 2010 greatest hits collection
- The Phoenix (Lyfe Jennings album)
- Phoenix (Just Surrender album)
- Phoenix (Labelle album)
- The Phoenix (Mastercastle album)
- Phoenix (Nocturnal Rites album)
- Phoenix (Rita Ora album)
- Phoenix, by Pink Turns Blue
- The Phoenix (Raghav album)
- Phoenix (Warlocks album)
- Phoenix (EP), by the Warlocks
- Phoenix (Zebrahead album)

==== Other uses in music ====
- Phoinix (instrument), also transliterated as phoenix, an ancient stringed instrument associated with the Phoenicians
- List of songs named for the phoenix

=== Television ===
- The Phoenix (1982 TV series), an American science fiction series
- Phoenix (Australian TV series), an Australian police drama
- Phoenix (South Korean TV series), a 2004 Korean drama
- Phoenix (anime), a 2004 Japanese series based on the manga
- "Phoenix", the 1986 premiere episode of The Adventures of the Galaxy Rangers
- "The Phoenix", a 1995 episode of Lois & Clark: The New Adventures of Superman
- "Phoenix", a 2003 episode of Smallville
- "Phoenix" (Breaking Bad), a 2009 episode of Breaking Bad
- "Phoenix" (NCIS), a 2012 episode of NCIS
- Phoenix (German TV channel), a German television channel

=== Video gaming ===
- Phoenix (1980 video game), a shoot 'em up arcade game
- Phoenix (1987 video game), a space combat simulation developed by ERE Informatique
- Phoenix Games, a video game company
- Phoenix1, a League of Legends team

=== Other uses in arts and entertainment ===
- Atlanta from the Ashes (The Phoenix), an Atlanta, Georgia, monument
- Phoenix Art Museum, the Southwest US' largest art museum for visual art
- Phoenix (chess), a fairy chess piece
- Phoenix (roller coaster)
- Phoenix, a Looping Starship ride at Busch Gardens Tampa Bay

== Business ==
In business, generally:

- Phoenix company, a commercial entity which has emerged from the collapse of another through insolvency

Specific businesses named "Phoenix" include:

=== Airlines ===
- Phoenix Air, operating from Georgia, US
- Phoenix Aviation, a UAE-Kyrgyzstan airline

=== Finance companies ===
- The Phoenix Companies, a Hartford-based financial services company
- Phoenix Finance, a financial company which attempted to enter into Formula One racing
- Phoenix Fire Office, a former British insurance company

=== Media companies ===
- Phoenix (German TV channel)
- Phoenix (St. Paul's Churchyard), a historical bookseller in London
- Phoenix Press
- Phoenix Television, a Hong Kong broadcaster

=== Theatres ===
- Phoenix Theatre (disambiguation)
- Phoenix Theatre, London, a West End theatre
- Phoenix Concert Theatre, a concert venue and nightclub in Toronto, Ontario, Canada

=== Manufacturers ===
==== Vehicle manufacturers ====
- Phoenix (bicycle company), a Chinese company
- Phoenix (British automobile company), an early 1900s company
- Phoenix Industries, an American aircraft manufacturer
- Phoenix Motorcars, a manufacturer of electric vehicles
- Phoenix Venture Holdings, owner of the MG Rover Group

==== Other manufacturers ====
- Phoenix (nuclear technology company), specializing in neutron generator technology
- Phoenix AG, a German rubber products company
- Phoenix Beverages, a brewery in Mauritius
- Phoenix Contact, a manufacturer of industrial automation, interconnection, and interface solutions
- Phoenix Iron Works (Phoenixville, Pennsylvania), owner of the Phoenix Bridge Company
- Phoenix Petroleum, a Philippine oil and gas company

== Military ==
- AIM-54 Phoenix, a missile
- BAE Systems Phoenix, an unmanned air vehicle
- HMHT-302 ("Phoenix"), a US Marine Corps helicopter squadron
- Phoenix breakwaters, a set of World War II caissons
- Phoenix Program, a Vietnam War military operation
- Project Phoenix (South Africa), a National Defence Force program

== People ==
- Phoenix (given name)
- Phoenix (surname), multiple people
- Phoenix (drag queen), American drag performer
- Dave Farrell (born 1977), American bass guitarist, stage name Phoenix, in the band Linkin Park
- Nahshon Even-Chaim (born 1971), or "Phoenix", convicted Australian computer hacker
- Jody Fleisch (born 1980), professional wrestler nicknamed "The Phoenix"

== Schools ==
- University of Phoenix, US
- Phoenix Academy (disambiguation), including several private schools
- Phoenix High School (disambiguation)

== Science and technology ==
=== Astronomy ===
- Phoenix Cluster, a galaxy cluster
- Phoenix (Chinese astronomy)
- Phoenix (constellation)
  - Phoenix stream, a stream of very old stars found in the constellation
- Phoenix Dwarf, a galaxy
- Project Phoenix (SETI), a search for extraterrestrial intelligence

=== Biology ===
- Phoenix (chicken)
- Phoenix (grape)
- Phoenix (moth)
- Phoenix (plant), a genus of palms

=== Computing ===
- Phoenix (computer), an IBM mainframe at the University of Cambridge
- Phoenix (tkWWW-based browser), a web browser and HTML editor discontinued in 1995
- Phoenix (web framework), a web development framework
- Phoenix Network Coordinates, used to compute network latency
- Phoenix Technologies, a BIOS manufacturer
- Apache Phoenix, a relational database engine
- Microsoft Phoenix, a compiler framework
- Mozilla Phoenix, the original name for the Firefox web browser
- Phoenix pay system, a payroll processing system

=== Vehicles and engines ===
==== Air and space ====
- AIM-54 Phoenix, a missile
- BAE Systems Phoenix, an unmanned air vehicle
- Bristol Phoenix, an aircraft engine
- EADS Phoenix, a prototype launch vehicle
- Phoenix Air Phoenix, a Czech glider
- Phoenix (spacecraft), a NASA mission to Mars
- To Phoenix, an inflatable tailless human-powered aircraft

==== Road ====
- Chrysler Phoenix engine, an automotive engine series
- Dodge Dart Phoenix, an American car produced 1960–1961
- Dodge Phoenix, Australian car produced 1960–1973
- Pontiac Phoenix, an American car produced 1977–1984

=== Other technologies ===
- Phoenix (ATC), an air traffic control system

== Ships ==
- HMS Phoenix, several Royal Navy ships
- Phoenix (East Indiaman), several ships that sailed for the British East India Company between 1680 and 1821
- USS Phoenix, several U.S. Navy ships
- Phoenix, involved in the 1688 Siege of Derry
- Phoenix (1792), involved in the sea otter trade
- Phoenix (1794), the first ship built in Russian America
- Phoenix (1798 ship), made one voyage in 1824 carrying convicts to Tasmania; grounded, condemned, and turned into a prison hulk; broken up in 1837
- Phoenix (steamboat), a steamboat built 1806–1807
- Phoenix (1809 ship), built in France in 1809; captured by the British Royal Navy in 1810; employed as a whaling ship from 1811 to 1829
- Phoenix (1810 ship), a merchant vessel launched in 1810; made one voyage to India for the British East India Company; made three voyages transporting convicts to Australia; wrecked in 1829
- Phoenix (1815 steamer), a steamboat that burned on Lake Champlain in 1819; its wreck is a Vermont state historic site
- Phoenix (1821 whaler), a Nantucket whaling vessel in operation 1821–1858
- Phoenix (1845), a steamship that burned on Lake Michigan in 1847 with the loss of at least 190 lives
- USCS Phoenix, a U.S. Coast Survey ship in service from 1845 to 1858
- Phoenix (1929 ship), a Danish ship built in 1929
- Phoenix, an American 1944 which exploded and sank in the Delaware River in 1953
- SS Flying Lark, which went by the name Phoenix from 1946 to 1948
- Phoenix (fireboat), a 1955 fireboat operating in San Francisco, California
- Phoenix (1973), a rescue vessel used to save migrants, refugees and other people in distress in the Mediterranean Sea

== Sports ==
- List of sports teams named for the phoenix
- Phoenix (sports team), a list of sports teams named after the mythological creature or Phoenix, Arizona
- Phoenix club (sports), a team that closes and is rebuilt under a new structure and often a new name
- Phoenix Finance, a Formula One entrant
- Phoenix Raceway, Avondale, Arizona
- Phoenix, an annual sports festival at the National Institute of Technology Karnataka

== Other uses ==
- Phoenix (currency), the first currency of modern Greece
- Phoenix codes, radio shorthand used by British police
- Phoenix National and Literary Society, 1856–1858 precursor of the Irish Republican Brotherhood
- Phoenix Pay System, a Canadian federal employee payroll system
- The Phoenix – S K Club, a social club at Harvard College
- The Phoenix Patrol Challenge, a Scoutcraft competition

== See also ==
=== Titles containing "phoenix" ===
- Phoenix Marketcity (disambiguation), a brand of shopping malls in India

=== Alternate spellings and translations ===
- De Phoenix (disambiguation)
- La Fenice (The Phoenix), an opera house in Venice, Italy
- Feniks (disambiguation)
- Fenix (disambiguation)
- Phenex, in demonology, a Great Marquis of Hell
- Phenix (disambiguation)
- Phönix (disambiguation)
- Fengcheng (disambiguation), various Chinese locations whose names mean "Phoenix" or "Phoenix City"

=== Other related terms ===
- Firebird (disambiguation)
