= Phoenix Project =

Phoenix Project may refer to:

- Phoenix Project (Pentagon), a part of the Pentagon Renovation Program
- The Phoenix Project (film), a 2015 film directed by Tyler Graham Pavey
- The Phoenix Project: Shifting from Oil to Hydrogen, a book by Harry Braun
- Project Phoenix (SETI) or Phoenix Project, a search for extraterrestrial intelligence in radio signal patterns
- The Phoenix Project (San Francisco) a nonprofit advocacy group in San Francisco, California
- The Phoenix Project: A Novel About IT, DevOps, and Helping Your Business Win, a fundamental book that introduced the concept of DevOps by Gene Kim, Kevin Behr, and George Spafford.

== See also ==
- Project Phoenix (disambiguation)
- Operation Phoenix (disambiguation)
