= Project Phoenix =

Project Phoenix may refer to:

- Project Phoenix, Discord's Rust-rebuilt client announced in November 2026
- Project Phoenix, a secret Nazi Germany project in the Call of Duty: Vanguard in 2021
- Project Phoenix (SETI), a search for extraterrestrial intelligence by listening for radio signals
- Project Phoenix (South Africa), South African National Defence Force programme to revive its Reserve Force element
- Project Phoenix (BBC), a BBC news-based magazine
- Project Phoenix (upcoming video game), an upcoming fantasy real-time strategy video game from Creative Intelligence Arts
- Project Phoenix (cancelled video game), a fantasy real-time strategy video game from Bungie that was cancelled circa 2003
- Project Phoenix, a football project of the Hong Kong Football Association

== See also ==
- Phoenix Program, a classified program during the latter stages of the Vietnam War
- Phoenix Project (disambiguation)
