= Penix =

Penix is a Cornish-language family name (Cornish surnames) originating in Cornwall. In medieval times, people were known by their given names, but as the population grew, surnames were added based on the place that they owned or lived in to distinguish people from one another. While Celtic people tended to use patronymic names, many Cornish people used local place names as surnames, sometimes in addition to patronymics.

The name Penix could be derived from a local place name; the family lived in the parish of Saint Pinnock, in Cornwall. Surnames are spelled in many ways, due to lack of spelling rules. Therefore, the name has been spelled Pinoke, Pinnick, Pinnock, Pincock and Pinock in addition to other variations of the name. The word "Pen" in Cornish means "head" or "end".

People named Penix include:

- Amanda Penix (born 1978), winner of Miss Oklahoma Teen USA 1997 and Miss Oklahoma USA 2000
- Jim Penix (fl. 1968–1970), American college basketball player
- Kevin Penix (1962–2012), American politician
- Marian Penix (1924–1991), American judge
- M. O. Penix (died 1955), American politician
- Michael Penix Jr. (born 2000), American football player
- Roy Penix (1891–1978), American politician

== See also ==
- Fenix (disambiguation)
- Phenix (disambiguation)
- Phoenix (disambiguation)
