= Pinnock =

Pinnock is an English surname. Notable people with the surname include:

- Andrew Pinnock (born 1980), American football player
- Anna Pinnock, set decorator
- Arnold Pinnock (born 1967), Canadian actor
- Chris Pinnock (born 1979), Jamaican hurdler
- Clark Pinnock (1937–2010), Canadian theologian
- Danielle Pinnock (born 1988), American actress
- Ethan Pinnock (born 1993), Jamaican footballer
- Hilary Pinnock, Professor of Primary Care Respiratory Medicine
- Hugh W. Pinnock (1934–2000), leader of the Latter Day Saint Church
- Kath Pinnock (born 1946), British politician
- James Pinnock (born 1978), English footballer
- Jason Pinnock (born 1999), American football player
- J. R. Pinnock (born 1983), American basketball player
- Leigh-Anne Pinnock (born 1991), British singer
- Pam Pinnock (born 1973), American author and publicist
- Sherene Pinnock (born 1987), Jamaican hurdler
- Thomas G. Pinnock (1851–1914), Massachusetts politician
- Trevor Pinnock (born 1946), English harpsichordist and conductor
- William Pinnock (1782–1843), British publisher
- Winsome Pinnock (born 1961), British playwright

== See also ==
- Penix, a surname
- Pinnick, a surname
- St Pinnock, Cornwall
