= Hindenburg disaster in popular culture =

The Hindenburg disaster has featured in a variety of popular culture films, TV programs and books.

== Film ==
The Hindenburg is a 1975 film about the disaster. Although much of the storyline is fictional, they were based on real bomb threats before the flight began, as well as proponents of the sabotage theory.

Hindenburg is a 2011 made-for-TV film starring Max Simonischek, Lauren Lee Smith, Stacy Keach, and Greta Scacchi. It was initially aired on RTL dubbed in German as a two-part series and later released as a DVD in English. It was aired in US in 2013 on Encore. Similar to the 1975 film, it focuses on the sabotage theory, though much of the storyline is fictional.

The 2015 film The Dust Storm includes a song called Hindenburg - a reference to the disaster.

In the 2022 crime/mystery film Glass Onion: A Knives Out Mystery, the characters repeatedly refer to the Hindenburg tragedy.

== Literature ==
In the Neal Stephenson novel Cryptonomicon, Lawrence Waterhouse is atop a fire tower in the Pine Barrens when he is "distracted by a false sunrise that lit up the clouds off to the northeast." Upon reaching the scene the author describes a disjointed scene of news reporters, an intense fire, people carrying charred bodies onto stretchers, and "a rocket-shaped pod stuck askew from the sand, supporting an umbrella of bent-back propellers". Waterhouse returns to the campsite and remarks, "Also I dreamed last night that a zeppelin was burning".

In the 2001 novel Passage by Connie Willis, the Hindenburg disaster is referred to at length, as the favorite disaster of Maisie, a little girl with heart problems and a passion for famous disasters, in the hospital where Dr. Joanna Lander, the main character, is investigating near-death experiences.

Love and Hydrogen, by Jim Shepard, deals with two crew men aboard the Hindenburg, Meinert and Gnüss, and their hidden love. The story takes place a day before the explosion and the moment of.

In book three of The Pendragon Adventure by D. J. MacHale: The Never War, the Hindenburg disaster is the major event to change first earth. The Travelers eventually realize that the Hindenburg disaster must happen to prevent larger disasters such as an atomic bomb dropped on the U.S.

In The Martian by Andy Weir, during The Great Hydrogen Scare of Sol 37, Watney states how the Hab is his private Hindenburg, ready to explode.

A son, Henning Boëtius, of one of the airship's officers, wrote a novel, The Phoenix. The novel is based on accounts Henning's father gave of the disaster.

In The Hindenburg Murders by Max Allan Collins, a fictionalised version of thriller author Leslie Charteris investigates possible sabotage on the airship.

In the Marvel Comics magazine Bizarre Adventures #25 (cover dated March 1981), it is revealed that in the Marvel Universe, the Hindenburg was destroyed in a battle between the sorceress Lady Megan Daemon and her evil sister Alisabeth.

In the novel version of Black Sunday Michael Lander the bomber comes from Lakehurst, New Jersey a nod to where the Hindenburg accident takes place.

== Music ==
Blues musician Lead Belly wrote a song titled, "The Hindenburg Disaster" (1937). This song can be heard on the record Leadbelly: The Library of Congress Recordings, recorded by John A. Lomax and Alan Lomax for Folkways Music Publishers.

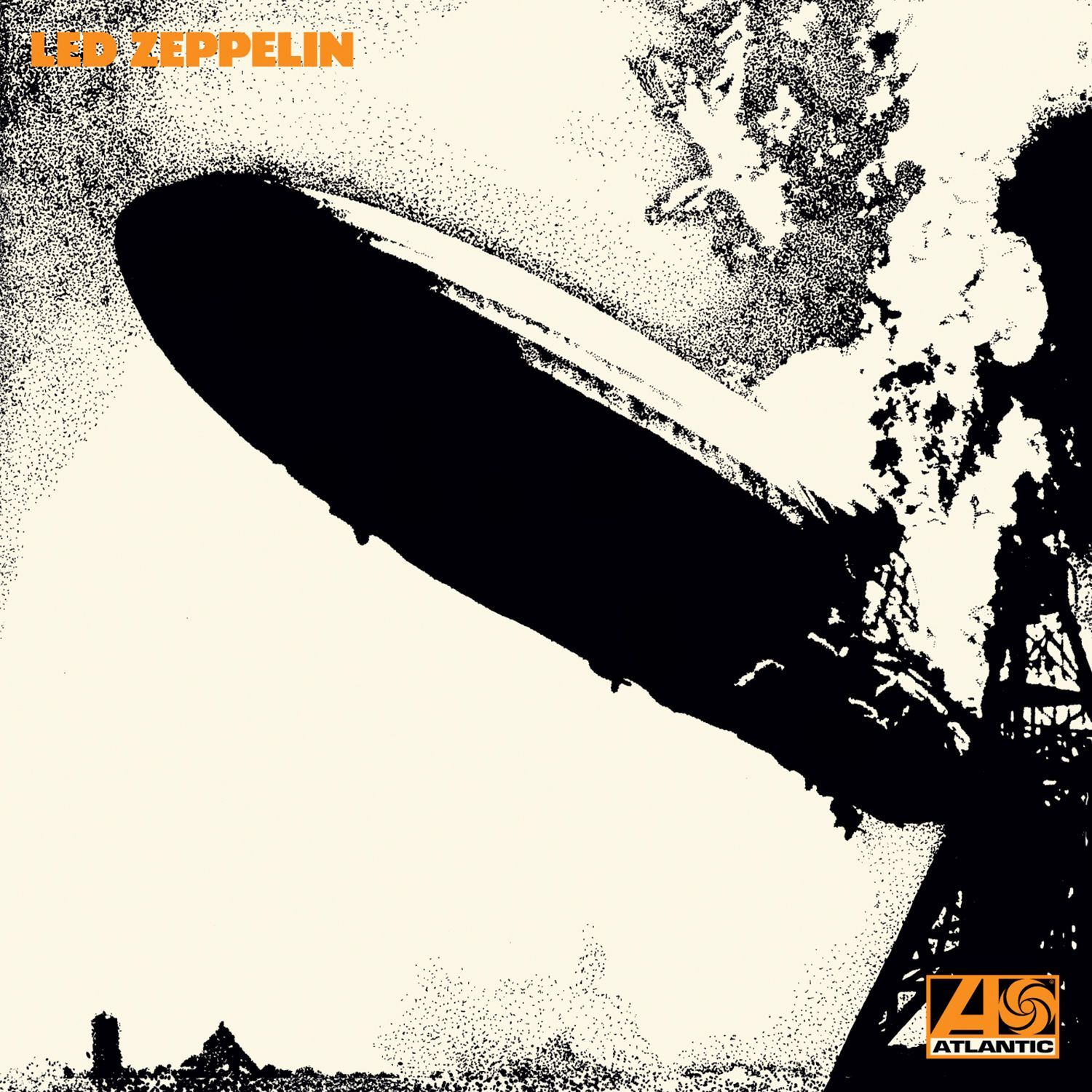
Led Zeppelin (1969) album cover

The cover of Led Zeppelin's self-titled debut album shows a stylized photo of the Hindenburg disaster with the band's name in the upper left corner. The cover was designed by George Hardie. The band's name is a reference to a popular catchphrase that refers to something, such as a joke, that falls flat; "That went down like a lead balloon." The band changed the spelling of "lead" to "led" so that it wouldn't be confused with "lead" as in a "lead singer" or "lead guitar".

The song "The Blimp" by Captain Beefheart and the Magic Band as issued on their 1969 Straight Records album Trout Mask Replica is a parody of Morrison's live description of the disaster as aired on radio the following day.

The satirical song "Smash Flop Hits" by Phil Ochs includes a verse about the Hindenburg disaster.

The song, "From The Sky", by Protest the Hero (Palimpsest, 2020) uses the disaster as an allegory for the glorification of historical events despite society's selective memory of details that do not fit the desired narrative.

== Television ==
In season 1, episode 4 of Entourage, Ari suggests to Vince that his next movie should be Hindenburg, stating that "It's like Titanic on a blimp." No further reference is made in the episode.

In season 2, episode 17 of Beyond Belief: Fact or Fiction, the twist at the end of "Bon Voyage" reveals that the story has been taking place on the Hindenburg moments before the crash. At the end of the episode, the story was revealed to be fictional.

Seinfeld made at least two references to the disaster. At the end of the episode "The Pothole", Newman's mail truck erupts into flames (after a series of events caused by Kramer), causing him to cry out, "Oh, the humanity!" The episode "The Puerto Rican Day" features a subplot in which George attempts to deliver a comical line ("That's gotta hurt!") during the fiery climax of the (fictional) film Blimp: The Hindenburg Story.

In The Sopranos episode, "Kaisha", Phil Leotardo notes the disappearance of Fat Dom Gamiello, and surmises that the Sopranos family killed Dom because he was last seen in New Jersey. Tony Soprano denies that claim, emphasizing the lack of evidence to support it, and adds: "The Hindenburg was last seen in New Jersey, too".

In the 1992 episode of The Simpsons, "Lisa the Beauty Queen", the Hindenburg disaster is parodied as Barney Gumble pilots the Duff Beer blimp with disastrous results, culminating with Kent Brockman reporting the scene by stating, "Oh, the humanity! Anyway...". Four years later in the episode "Bart the Fink", Bart receives a check book depicting the Hindenburg disaster in flip-book fashion, referred to as "Check Style No. 9 'Oh the Humanity...'".

In Rescue Me's first-season episode "Kansas", Sean Garrity learns about the Hindenburg disaster after his crew made fun of him for not knowing what it was.

The Hindenburg disaster is chronicled in the popular 1970s television drama, The Waltons where John Boy Walton wins a writing contest to cover the landing of the Hindenburg, witnessing the unforeseen tragedy in person. Original newsreel footage of the event was integrated into the episode's scenes.

On the popular CBS situation comedy WKRP in Cincinnati episode "Turkeys Away" the depiction of falling turkeys by Les Nessman is intended to emulate Herbert Morrison's broadcast.

In season 4 of the sitcom 'Til Death, Brad Garrett's character Eddy is writing a book on the Hindenburg disaster.

In the season 11 episode of Family Guy titled "Yug Ylimaf", Brian goes back in time to the Hindenburg disaster to have sex with a woman he met. They use the footage of the disaster in that scene and add Brian and the girl to the footage. In the season 4 episode titled "The Cleveland–Loretta Quagmire", Peter Griffin owns a zeppelin with his face on it that he calls the "Hindenpeter", which crashes in the same fashion as the Hindenburg, but in the Swansons' property.

On The Richard Bey Show they used the audio from the disaster as a sound effect, specifically the "Oh the humanity!" line.

Victor Rjesnjansky on A&E's Storage Wars: Texas often refers to his competitors, Ricky and Bubba, as "the Hindenburgs", a reference to their portly physique.

In the Archer episode "Skytanic", which takes place on board an airship, Archer makes several references to the Hindenburg due to his paranoia about the airship catching fire, despite the airship's captain repeatedly telling him that the ship uses non-flammable helium.

In The Amazing World of Gumball episode "The Void", while Gumball, Darwin, and Mr. Small escape from the dimension that Molly is trapped in (full of all the mistakes the world has ever made), they all jump upon an airship resembling the Hindenburg that then catches fire and crashes into a structural pylon, much like the disaster.

In the Rocko's Modern Life episode "Feisty Geist", while visiting a fortune teller, Heffer Wolfe is told of his past lives, and one of them is of when he was a hungry passenger aboard the airship Hillenburger (also a play on the name of the show's creative director Stephen Hillenburg). The German Heffer runs for the buffet, causing the zeppelin to lower and crash-land in a fireball, sending him flying.

The CatDog episode "CatDogPig" features a blimp advertising job interviews as a running gag throughout the episode. At the end, the blimp crashes into a pile of characters that CatDog had just dumped off, exploding and sending them all flying.

In the Blue Mountain State episode "The Corn Field Pt. 1", the incident is referenced by Harmon when discussing a large joint of weed. The line "Oh the humanity!" is used jokingly by Donnie who is promptly ostracized by Larry for making light of the tragedy.

The pilot episode of the NBC TV series Timeless (3 October 2016) revolves around a criminal who steals a time machine in an effort to alter the events of the past, starting with the Hindenburg disaster. In the episode, a journalist standing directly under the Hindenburg gets killed when it crashes down (in the original timeline). Historically, however, it was a man on the ground docking crew who died.

Multiple episodes of J. J. Abrams's FOX series, Fringe, take place in a parallel universe, an identifying characteristic of which is the modern-day popularity of airships due to the non-occurrence of the Hindenburg disaster in that universe.

Devious Maids season four episode eight, Adrian and Evelyn toast their divorce with a bottle of 1932 Riesling salvaged from the Hindenburg.

Season One, Episode Six of The Umbrella Academy includes a plot line in which Number Five must guarantee the Hindenburg disaster happens through his work with the Temps Commission. The episode posits that Joseph Späh was the original saboteur, but changed his mind about carrying out the disaster after all and leading Number Five to come up with an alternative solution.

=== Television investigations ===
The Discovery Channel series MythBusters explored the incendiary paint hypothesis and the hydrogen hypothesis in an episode that aired January 10, 2007. While their experiments did not concern what actually started the fire, the show's hosts, Adam Savage and Jamie Hyneman, demonstrated that when set alight with a blowtorch a 1:50 scale model of the Hindenburg burnt twice as fast in the presence of diffused hydrogen as without it. Combustion was observed in the burning skin, which would have accelerated the fire, but their experiments showed that hydrogen was the main fuel. The hydrogen-filled model produced a fire with flames that came out of the nose and resembled the newsreel footage of the Hindenburg disaster. That program concluded that the incendiary paint theory (IPT) myth was "Busted".

The MythBusters constructed three 1/50 scale models made out of welded steel wire and covered in cotton fabric. They were suspended from a hangar ceiling and stayed horizontal the entire time. The first model was painted with iron-oxide and then aluminum powder dopes, closely replicating the actual skin of the Hindenburg. Ignited with a blowtorch, it took about 2 minutes to burn, with thermite-like events (sparkling blazes) noted in a few places. The second model had the same skin, but a water trough inside diffused hydrogen gas at sub-explosive concentrations. This one burned about twice as fast, with more thermite burning. The third model, done more for spectacle than anything else, had the skin painted with a thermite-like iron-oxide and aluminum powder enriched dope. It was noted that it would probably be far too heavy to fly. With model 2's hydrogen enrichment, it took 30 seconds to completely consume the skin. The conclusion was that neither the hydrogen gas nor the flammable skin bore sole responsibility for the speed of the fire, but both contributed.

The National Geographic Channel program Seconds From Disaster had veteran air crash investigator Greg Feith study all of the available evidence, including eyewitness accounts, interviews with the last two living survivors, newsreel footage, weather reports, and the Hindenburg blueprints. Feith burned a sample of doped cloth and it took one minute to consume the whole piece, ruling out the skin as the primary accelerant. Feith's investigation came to a conclusion that the hydrogen puncture hypothesis was most probable. He also proved that by adding white cloth to a hydrogen flame that it would change the fire's color from invisible to orange.

In Search of..., a show mainly focused on paranormal investigations and conspiracy theories, made an episode based on this tragic accident, and immediately raised the question of whether it was really an accident or instead sabotage by then-Nazi Germany.

== Internet ==
In the shared alternate history of Ill Bethisad (1997 and after), an analogue of the Hindenburg disaster called the "Dornburg Disaster" appears. The aircraft was called the Dornburg Db-VI (known colloquially in German as "Debe-Sechs"), a flying boat style airplane which was designed in 1935 and built in late 1936 by its namesake, German engineer Klaus von Dornburg. In the fictional alternate universe setting of Ill Bethisad, airships overtook airplanes as the main form of air transport in the 1930s and the Dornburg was intended to show off the advantages of the airplane compared to the airship. On May 6, 1938, the Dornburg's engine catches fire during a flight from Bahia to Rio de Janeiro, killing all 58 passengers and 18 crew members. As a result of the disaster and the publicity surrounding it, public confidence in airplanes is shattered and the airship quickly overtakes the airplane as the most common form of air transport. In the present day, airships are used for civilian uses such as airlines, while airplanes are relegated to military use.
