= List of periodicals named Phoenix =

Phoenix has been a popular name for newspapers and other periodicals. Following is a list of publications of these types that have borne the name.

== Periodicals ==
- Phoenix (classics journal), founded in 1946 as the first journal of classics in Canada
- Phoenix (literary magazine), a samizdat literary journal published between 1960 and 1966
- Phoenix, a city magazine published in Phoenix, Arizona
- Phoenix a student-run literary magazine at the University of Tennessee
- Phoenix a student-run literary magazine at Valencia College
- The Phoenix (magazine), an Irish news and satire magazine published since 1983
- The Phoenix (pacifist journal), published from 1936 to 1940 at an artist's commune in Woodstock, New York
- The Phoenix, a student-run literary magazine at Baylor University
- The Phoenix, a student-run literary magazine at Augusta University
- The Phoenix, a boardgaming and wargaming magazine published in the 1970s and 1980s by Simulations Publications, Inc.

== Newspapers ==
- Bristol Phoenix, a Bristol, Rhode Island newspaper, published by East Bay Newspapers
- The Phoenix (newspaper), an American chain of alternative weekly city newspapers
- Loyola Phoenix, a Loyola University (United States) publication
- Muskogee Phoenix, an Oklahoma, USA publication
- The Phoenix, a Swarthmore College (United States) publication
- The Phoenix, a University of British Columbia Okanagan Campus (Canada) publication

== See also ==
- Phoenix (disambiguation)
