= Phönix =

Phönix (German for the mythological phoenix) may refer to:

== Aviation ==
- Phönix Flugzeug-Werke, an Austro-Hungarian aircraft manufacturer
- LFG Phönix, a German flying boat glider built in the early 1920s
- Phönix 20.01 and 20.02, first and second prototypes of the Albatros B.I German military reconnaissance aircraft for Austrian production
- Akaflieg Stuttgart fs24, nicknamed "Phönix", a West German glider first flown in 1957

== German association football clubs ==
- FC Phönix Bellheim, based in Bellheim, Rhineland-Palatinate
- Berliner FC Phönix, based in Berlin from the late 1890s to 1903
- 1. FC Phönix Lübeck, based in Lübeck, Schleswig-Holstein
- Phönix Ludwigshafen, original name of SV Südwest Ludwigshafen, based in Ludwigshafen am Rhein, Rhineland-Palatinate

== Other uses ==
- SS Phönix (1913), a German cargo ship converted into a Kriegsmarine patrol boat for World War II as VP-106 Phönix
- Theater Phönix, a theater in Linz, Austria
- Phönix Elektrizitätsgesellschaft (Phoenix Electricity Company), an early name for Phoenix Contact, a manufacturer of industrial automation, interconnection, and interface solutions

== See also ==
- Phoenix (disambiguation)
