= Feng Sheng =

Feng Sheng (also Fengsheng or Feng-sheng) can refer to:

== Art ==
- Feng Sheng, a character in The Female Prince
- Feng Sheng Music, a Chinese record label used by Wang Feng (singer)
- The Message (Chinese: 风声; pinyin: Fēng Shēng), a 2007 novel by Mai Jia
- The Message (2009 film), based on Mai Jia's novel
- Fengsheng Style (奉聖樂), a Chinese musical style
- Fengsheng Shuiqi (风生水起), 1997 Chinese television program starring Li Bingbing

== Business ==
- Fengsheng Motors, a Dongfeng Motors subsidiary

== People ==
- Huang Feng-sheng, a member of Chinese Taipei men's national volleyball team
- Liu Fengsheng (劉豐生), (died 548), Chinese major general who died in a siege of Xuchang, Henan
- Feng Sheng (general) (c. 1330–1395), Chinese Ming dynasty general

== See also ==
- Fengcheng (disambiguation)
- Fengshen (disambiguation)
