= Phoenix (given name) =

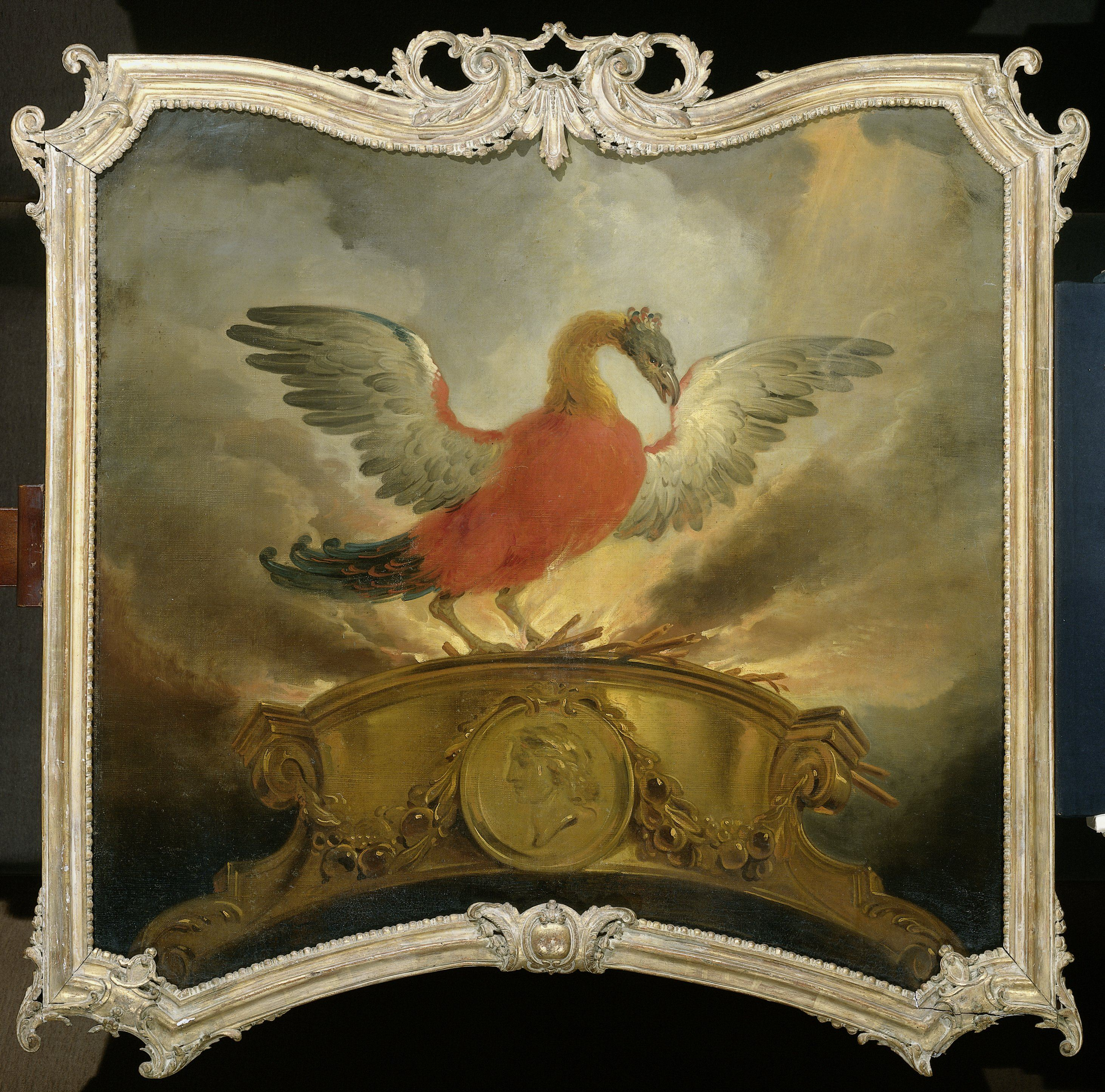
- The Phoenix by Cornelis Troost.
- Gender: Unisex

Origin
- Origin: Greek
- Meaning: Phoenix

Phoenix is a modern given name derived from the name for a mythological bird from Greek myth that has become a symbol of renewal, regeneration and immortality. It is a name in use for both boys and girls.

== Popularity ==
The name has been among the one thousand most popular names for boys in the United States since 1995 and among the top three hundred names for boys since 2017. It has been among the top one thousand names for American girls since 2003 and among the top three hundred names for American girls since 2020. It has been among the top five hundred most popular names for boys in England and Wales since 2004 and among the top two hundred since 2020. It has also been among the top one thousand names for boys in Australia and New Zealand in the past decade. It has been among the top five hundred names for girls in England and Wales since 2018.

== Females ==
- Phoenix Coldon (born 1988), American woman who disappeared in 2011
- Phoenix Sinclair (2000–2005), Canadian murder victim

== Males ==
- Pheonix Copley (born 1992), American ice hockey goaltender
- Phoenix Laroche (born 2012/2013), English actor
- Phoenix Raei (born 1990), Australian actor, director and producer of Iranian descent
- Phoenix Sanders (born 1995), American baseball player
- Phoenix Scholtz (born 2005), Northern Irish professional footballer

== Stage name ==
- Phoenix Jones, stage name of American mixed martial artist Benjamin Fodor (born 1988)

== Fictional characters ==
- Phoenix (son of Agenor), character from Greek myth
- Phoenix (son of Amyntor), character from Greek myth
- Phoenix Buchanan, primary antagonist in the 2017 film Paddington 2.
- Phoenix Hathaway, a character in the British soap opera Hollyoaks
- Phoenix Warner, a character on the New Zealand soap opera Shortland Street
- Phoenix Wright, attorney featured in hit video game and anime, Ace Attorney

== See also ==
- Phoenix (surname)
