= Phoenix Academy =

Phoenix Academy may refer to:

- Phoenix Academy, Iraq, an army training facility in Taji, Iraq
- Phoenix Academy (North Carolina), an elementary school in High Point, North Carolina, United States
- Phoenix Academy, Shepherd's Bush, a secondary school in London, England
- Phoenix College Preparatory Academy, a high school in Phoenix, Arizona, United States
- Phoenix Hebrew Academy, a Jewish day school in Phoenix, Arizona, United States

== See also ==
- Phoenix (disambiguation)
