= Fengshen =

Fengshen is the romanization of several Chinese words, (Chinese: 封神; lit. 'Investiture of god', or simplified Chinese: 风神; traditional Chinese: 風神; lit. 'Wind God') may refer to:

- Investiture of the Gods (Fengshen Bang), a Chinese epic fantasy novel written during the Ming Dynasty
  - Hoshin Engi a Japanese anime loosely based on the Investiture of the Gods
- Dongfeng Fengshen, a Chinese automobile marque owned by Dongfeng Motor Group
- List of storms named Fengshen
  - Typhoon Fengshen (2002), a Category 5 super typhoon which took place in the West Pacific in July 2002
  - Typhoon Fengshen (2008), a Category 3 typhoon which killed more than 1,300 people in June 2008, primarily in the Philippines

== See also ==
- Feng Sheng (disambiguation)
- List of wind deities
