= List of songs named for the phoenix =

The phoenix has provided the name for a number of songs, often incorporating the mythological bird's theme of rebirth. Following is a list of songs so named:

- "Phoenix" (ASAP Rocky song), by ASAP Rocky.
- "Phoenix", by Big Red Machine featuring Fleet Foxes and Anaïs Mitchell from How Long Do You Think It's Gonna Last?
- "Phoenix", by Breaking Pangaea, from Phoenix.
- "Phoenix", by Breaking Point from Coming Of Age.
- "The Phoenix", by Brymo from Libel.
- "Phoenix", by Burnout Syndromes, the opening theme of Haikui!! season 4.
- "Phoenix", by The Butterfly Effect.
- "Phoenix", by The Cult, from Love.
- "Phœnix", by Daft Punk, from Homework.
  - "Phoenix", remixed version by Basement Jaxx, featured on Daft Punk's 2003 Remix Album "Daft Club".
- "Phoenix," by Dan Fogelberg, from Phoenix.
- "Phoenix", by Decoded Feedback, from Shockwave.
- "The Phoenix", by Fall Out Boy, from Save Rock and Roll.
- "The Phoenix", by Galneryus, from Phoenix Rising.
- "The Phoenix", by Labelle, from Phoenix.
- "Phoenix", a 2019 promotional single by League of Legends, Cailin Russo, and Chrissy Costanza for the 2019 League of Legends World Championship.
- "Phoenix", by Magic Carpet, from Magic Carpet.
- "Le Phénix" by Michel Corrette, concerto.
- "Phoenix", by Molly Sandén.
- "Phoenix", by Morissette.
- "Phoenix", by Nelly Furtado, from The Ride.
- "Phoenix", by Netrum and Halvorsen.
- "Phoenix", by Nmixx from Blue Valentine.
- "Phoenix", by Olivia Holt (debut single)
- "The Phoenix", by Pepper, from Pink Crustaceans and Good Vibrations.
- "Phoenix", by The Prodigy, from Always Outnumbered, Never Outgunned.
- "The Phoenix" by Pyramid, featured in the Horizon Pulse radio station in the 2014 open-world racing video game Forza Horizon 2.
- "Phoenix", by Santti, Diskover, and Matthew Parker.
- "Phoenix", by Satyricon, from Satyricon.
- "Phoenix", by Scandroid, from The Darkness.
- "Phenix", by Sentenced, from Amok.
- "The Phoenix", by Silent Civilian, from Ghost Stories.
- "Phoenix", by Stratovarius, from Infinite.
- "Phoenix", by Stray Kids from Karma.
- "Phoenix", by Veil of Maya, from Matriarch.
- "Phoenix", by Wishbone Ash, from Wishbone Ash.
- "Phoenix", by Wolfmother, from Cosmic Egg.

== See also ==
- Phoenix (disambiguation)
