= Pinnick =

Pinnick is a surname. Notable people with the surname include:

- Amaju Pinnick (born 1970), Nigerian football administrator
- Caden Pinnick, American college football quarterback
- Chris Pinnick (born 1953), American guitarist and songwriter
- Doug Pinnick (born 1950), American musician

== See also ==
- Pinnock
- Winnick
