= Phoenix (sports team) =

Phoenix is a common name for sports teams named after the mythological phoenix or, indirectly, from places named for that creature. Teams including this name include:

== Based in Phoenix, Arizona, United States ==
- Arizona Cardinals, an American football team (NFL) known as the Phoenix Cardinals from 1988 to 1993
- Arizona Coyotes, a hockey team (NHL) known as the Phoenix Coyotes from 1996 to 2014
- Phoenix Mercury, a women's basketball team (WNBA)
- Phoenix Rising FC, a soccer team (USLC)
- Phoenix Suns, a men's basketball team (NBA)

== Association football/soccer ==
- A.F.C. Phoenix, a football club based in Rotherham, South Yorkshire, England.
- Altona East Phoenix SC, an Australian soccer club based in the western suburbs of Melbourne
- Phoenix Baia Mare, a football club in Romania
- FC Phoenix Banjë, a professional football club from Kosovo
- Brisbane Phoenix FC, an Australian soccer club
- Gibraltar Phoenix F.C., a defunct football club from Gibraltar
- Jõhvi FC Phoenix, an Estonian football club
- Leicester Phoenix, a rugby league football club in England
- Penmaenmawr Phoenix F.C., a Welsh football team
- GPS Portland Phoenix, a defunct American soccer team based in Portland, Maine
- South West Phoenix FC, an Australian semi-professional association football club based in Bunbury, Western Australia
- Phoenix Sports F.C., an English football club located in Barnehurst, Kent
- Phoenix Rising FC, a soccer team (USLC) based in Phoenix, Arizona
- Team Phoenix F.C., a Burmese football club
- Twin Cities Phoenix, a defunct American soccer team
- AS Phoenix Ulmu, a Romanian football club based in Ulmu, Călărași County
- Wellington Phoenix FC, a football club in Wellington, New Zealand
- Wellington Phoenix FC (A-League Women), based in Wellington, New Zealand
- Worplesdon Phoenix F.C., an English football club based in Worplesdon, Surrey

== College athletics ==
- Elon Phoenix, the athletic teams of Elon University in the United States
- UW–Green Bay Phoenix, the athletic teams of the University of Wisconsin-Green Bay in the United States

== Cricket ==
- Phoenix Cricket Club, in Ireland
- Yorkshire Phoenix, a cricket club in England

== Motorsports ==
- Phoenix Racing, a NASCAR team
- Phoenix Racing (Germany), a touring car and GT racing team

== Other sports ==
- Manchester Phoenix, an ice hockey team in England
- Melbourne Phoenix, a netball team in Australia
- South East Melbourne Phoenix, a basketball team in Australia
- Phoenix Hagen, a basketball club in Germany
- Tamworth Phoenix, an American football club in England
- Tawe Phoenix Boat Club, the alumni club of Swansea University Rowing Club in the United Kingdom
- Victorian Phoenix Water Polo Club, based in Melbourne, Australia

== See also ==
- Phoenix (disambiguation)
- Phoenix club (sports), a term for a professional sports team that replaces one that has failed in a business sense
