= Fenix =

Fenix, Fénix (Spanish and Portuguese) and Fênix (Brazilian Portuguese) all mean phoenix and may refer to:

== Business ==
- Fenix Automotive, a British sports car manufacturer founded by Lee Noble in 2009
- Fénix Directo, a Spanish insurance company
- Synton Fenix, a modular synthesizer
- El Fenix (restaurant), a chain of restaurants in Texas, U.S.

== Entertainment ==
- Fenix (magazine) (also Feniks), a Polish science fiction magazine published from 1990 to 2001
- Marcus Fenix, the main character of the video game Gears of War
- Praetor Fenix, a fictional character in the StarCraft series and Heroes of the Storm
- Fenix, a 2017 Dutch-Belgium television series starring Teun Luijkx

=== Music ===
- Fenix TX, a punk band
- Fénix (Gato Barbieri album), a 1971 album by Gato Barbieri
- Fénix (Nicky Jam album), a 2017 album by Nicky Jam
- Fenix (Gordi album), a 2024 album by Gordi

== Places ==
- Fênix, a town in Brazil, 5,000 population
- Fénix Grande River, a river in Argentina
- Aguada Fénix a Preclassic Mayan ruin in Tabasco, Mexico

== Sports ==
- Club Atlético Fénix, an Argentine football club
- Centro Atlético Fénix, a Uruguayan football club
- Fênix 2005 Futebol Clube, a Brazilian football club
- Fenix FC, a Catalan football club

== Other uses ==
- Fenix (gamer), South Korean professional League of Legends player
- Fénix (wrestler) (born 1990), Mexican professional wrestler
- Fénix capsules, rescue capsules used in the 2010 Copiapó mining accident
- FENIX Museum of Migration in Rotterdam
- El Fénix (automobile)
- CX 40 Radio Fénix, a Uruguayan radio station
- Garmin Fenix, a line of GPS smartwatches
- Shoalwater (sidewheeler 1852), a former name of the Willamette River steamer Fenix
- Fenix, the codename of the Mozilla Firefox for Android web browser

== See also ==
- Feniks (disambiguation)
- Penix (surname)
- Phenix (disambiguation)
- Phoenix (disambiguation)
