= Operation Phoenix =

Operation Phoenix or Phenix may refer to:

== Military ==
- Phoenix Program, CIA military, intelligence, and internal security program during the Vietnam War
- Vela incident, alleged 1979 Israeli–South African nuclear test that was supposedly codenamed "Operation Phenix"
- Project Phoenix (South Africa), SANDF project to revitialise the Reserve Force
- Operation Phoenix (South Africa), South African response to mass SWAPO infiltration of South-West Africa
- 2008 Colombian raid into Ecuador, codenamed Operación Fénix (Operation Phoenix)
- Operation Phoenix (1966), Vietnam War military operation, February 1966 in Biên Hòa Province
- Operation Phoenix (1995), Croatian Army defence of Slavonia during Operation Storm

== Other ==
- Operation Phoenix (railway), Victorian Railways post-war rebuilding project commenced in 1950
- Operation Phoenix (album), album by Good Riddance
- Operation Phoenix (game expansion), a game add-on for Counter-Strike: Global Offensive
