= Phoenix pay system =

Canadian payroll processing system

The Phoenix pay system is a payroll processing system for Canadian federal government employees, provided by IBM in June 2011 using PeopleSoft software, and run by Public Services and Procurement Canada. The Public Service Pay Centre is located in Miramichi, New Brunswick. It was first introduced in 2009 as part of Prime Minister Stephen Harper's Transformation of Pay Administration Initiative, intended to replace Canada's 40-year old system with a new, cost-saving "automated, off-the-shelf commercial system."

By July 2018, Phoenix had caused pay problems to close to 80 per cent of the federal government's 290,000 public servants through underpayments, over-payments, and non-payments. The Standing Senate Committee on National Finance, chaired by Senator Percy Mockler, sought to examine the causes for the failure, holding "eight meetings with 28 witnesses, including the Auditor General of Canada, union representatives, departments and agencies, officials from IBM, the Minister of Public Services and Procurement and the Clerk of the Privy Council" and paid a visit to the Miramichi pay system location during their investigation. Their report, "The Phoenix Pay Problem: Working Towards a Solution", was released on July 31, 2018, in which they called Phoenix a failure and an "international embarrassment". Instead of saving $70 million a year as planned, the report said that the cost to taxpayers to fix Phoenix's problems could reach a total of $2.2 billion by 2023. The Office of the Auditor General of Canada also performed an independent audit, and published a report in 2018 that concluded that the Phoenix project “was an incomprehensible failure of project management and oversight”, and that Phoenix executives did not heed warnings from the Miramichi Pay Centre, costing the federal government hundreds of millions of dollars, and had a negative financial impact on tens of thousands of its employees.

As of June 2025, the system has cost the government more than $5.1 billion. There was a backlog of more than 408,000 unresolved pay issues affecting federal employees as of October 2024. As of February 2026, the backlog is now at 216,000 transactions.

== History ==
=== Preparing for rollout ===
The 2009 initial funding, the 2010 initiation, the 2016 implementation, and ongoing operation of what would become the Phoenix pay system, was overseen by a series of the Department of Public Services and Procurement Canada Ministers, spanning the tenure of former-Prime Minister Harper (February 6, 2006 – November 4, 2015) and Prime Minister Justin Trudeau (November 4, 2015 – March 14, 2025). Three ministers oversaw these various stages under Harper—Christian Paradis, from June 25, 2008, to January 19, 2010, Rona Ambrose from January 19, 2010, to July 14, 2013, and Diane Finley from July 15, 2013, to November 4, 2015. Under its new name of Public Services and Procurement—Judy Foote, who was appointed by Trudeau, served from November 4, 2015, to August 24, 2017. Trudeau appointed Carla Qualtrough to serve from August 28, 2017, to November 20, 2019. The name of the ministry was changed to Public Services and Procurement and Accessibility while Qualtrough was in office. The current Minister of Public Services and Procurement is Anita Anand, who was appointed by Prime Minister Trudeau on November 20, 2019. Judy Foote became PSPC Minister and Marie Lemay, deputy minister, in Trudeau's first cabinet on November 4, 2015, just after the fall election. By May 2016, "Phoenix errors and delays" had already "affected about 82,000 public servants."

Following the 2008 recession, Prime Minister Harper was focused on reducing costs, which included reducing the size of the civil service. According to the Ottawa Citizen, in July 2009, then-Prime Minister Stephen Harper's cabinet, approved funding for a $310-million Public Works initiative called Transformation of Pay Administration Initiative (TPA). The two parts of the TPA were Pay Modernization and Pay Consolidation. Pay Modernization referred to the replacement of the 40-year-old existing payroll system—the Regional Pay System (RPS)—with a commercial off-the-shelf (COTS) system. The second aspect of the TPA—Pay Consolidation—referred to the transferral of pay services of departments and agencies that had been using the existing Government of Canada IT system for human resources—My Government of Canada Human Resources (My GCHR)—to a new centralized Pay Centre with all payroll administration and employees in one place. Phoenix would serve "101 departments and nearly 300,000 employees". The hope was that a new, more centralized and automated system would lower labour requirements and reduce costs by $78 million a year by "eliminating 650 positions, automating pay processes, and eliminating duplicate data entry." It was expected to be online by 2015.

In August 2010, Stephen Harper announced that the new Public Service Pay Centre would be located in Miramichi, New Brunswick, as compensation for the closing of the long-gun registry centre in that city.

In June 2011, IBM won the sole-source contract to set up the system, using PeopleSoft software, the original contract was for $5.7 million, but IBM was eventually paid $185 million. According to The New York Times, Oracle Corporation's PeopleSoft software system was "widely used by corporations and institutions to manage operations, finances and employees."

In March 2014, according to an IBM spokeswoman, the Crown took over responsibility for "training design and execution" from IBM in a cost-saving measure. The government adopted a 'train the trainer' approach rather than follow IBM's recommended system.

Prior to 2012, about 2,000 pay advisors/specialists in 101 federal departments and agencies "processed pay, advised employees, and corrected errors" in scattered locations. When the new Miramichi Public Service Pay Centre was opened in May 2012, the PSPC began to eliminate pay advisor positions in 46 individual departments and agencies and replace them with "460 pay advisors and 90 support staff" at new centralized location in Pay Centre. By 2016, the PSPC had cut 1,200 pay advisor positions. Following centralization, these departments and agencies administrators no longer had "direct access to the new pay system." There were an additional 55 departments and agencies who maintained approximately 800 pay advisors who continued to enter pay information for their own employees in the new Phoenix system.

In May 2015, IBM made the recommendation that government delay its planned rollout of Phoenix due to critical problems. In June 2015, before Phoenix was launched, some federal employees complained about not being paid, and there were reports that the Miramichi pay centre employees were overwhelmed. The Auditor General's May 29, 2018 report "Building and Implementing the Phoenix Pay System" found that in June 2015, Public Services and Procurement Canada cancelled a pilot to test Phoenix in a single department to assess whether Phoenix was ready for government wide use.

Two reports by two independent contractors—Gartner Consulting and Calgary-based S.i. Systems—were commissioned. S.i. Systems submitted their report to Public Services and Procurement Canada (PSPC) departmental staff in January 2016. PSPC received the Gartner Consulting report on February 11, 2016. Both consultants were charged with assessing the viability of the Phoenix payroll system before a government-wide rollout. Neither report called for implementation to be stopped, but offered suggestions to mitigate risks. The S.i. Systems report concluded that Phoenix should move forward, as "the benefits of doing so appear to outweigh the risks. The next phase will be challenging, but it is likely that the problems and difficulties that will be encountered will be manageable." The Gartner report casts a different picture, specifically predicting there was a moderate possibility that "expectations for accuracy and timeliness of pay may not be met as a result of lack of true end-to-end testing." Judy Foote, the Minister of Public Services and Procurement Canada was never briefed on the Gartner report by her departmental staffers.

=== After rollout ===
In February 2016, the first wave of the Phoenix pay system was launched to over 34 government departments, affecting 120,000 employees. The New York Times reported that when the "government switched to the new payroll system", "about 2,700 payroll clerks who were no longer supposed to be needed" were laid off. The Times said that the Canadian federal government "manages a payroll of 20 billion Canadian dollars a year, about $15 billion."

By April 2016, CBC News reported that there were thousands of public servants experiencing Phoenix payroll problems with initial complaints about underpayments. The PSAC, a federal employee union, called for the Liberal government to delay the second phase of the Phoenix roll out. Despite this request, the federal government rolled out Phoenix to the remaining 67 departments on April 21, 2016, and decommissioned the old system.

After the roll out, there were continued complaints about underpayments, over-payments, and non-payments. In June 2016, the government launched a satellite pay centre in Gatineau in a response to the problems, with about 100 employees. On June 28, a dozen federal unions, including the Public Service Alliance of Canada (PSAC) launched a lawsuit in the Federal Court against the government trying to force on-time payments. Plaintiffs included 2,000 Parks Canada seasonal employees represented by the PSAC who had worked from April to June without pay.

By July 2016, Marie Lemay, PSPC deputy minister, became "the face of the bungled Phoenix pay system" after the PSPC "first revealed that its Phoenix errors and delays had affected about 82,000 public servants." The NDP and Conservatives issued statements in July requesting updates on Phoenix pay problems and as a result the federal government called for a July 28, "emergency summer meeting of the House of Commons operations and estimates committee. In addition, the Auditor General, Michael Ferguson, was asked to investigate and report on Phoenix pay problems. At that time, it was estimated that the problems would be fixed by the end of October 2016, for an additional cost of $20 million, but by then there were still 20,000 outstanding cases. The government delayed its target for fixing the backlog to the end of 2016, a deadline that was also not met.

In September 2016, Judy Foote, who was the minister responsible for the Phoenix payroll system rollout in 2016, and who served as minister from November 4, 2015 to August 24, 2017, was questioned by a House of Commons committee. Members of the opposition NDP suggested Foote should take more responsibility for Phoenix problems.

An independent, third-party firm—Goss Gilroy Inc. (GGI)—hired by the Treasury Board of Canada Secretariat (TBS) and the PSPC in early 2017—undertook a study of the federal government's "activities related to the Transformation of Pay Administration Initiative (TPA) from 2008 to April 2016." The GGI report, "Lessons Learned from the Transformation of Pay Administration Initiative", was submitted in October 2017.

By May 2017, after several government announcements, the total cost of fixing the system had increased to $400 million. In September 2017, the Auditor General of Canada, submitted a report, "Phoenix Pay Problems" to Parliament, and concluded that Public Services and Procurement Canada had failed in both resolving pay issues and in providing affected departments with the relevant information and support to resolve their employees pay problems. They emphasized the urgency of the issue as Phoenix' pay problems financially affected thousands of public servants in a government with an annual payroll in 2017 of about $22 billion. The report said that PSPC knew that they had to "analyze all 200 of the programs" that had been added to PeopleSoft "to identify the system-related sources of pay errors". PSPC only began its analysis in March 2017 and had only analysed "6 of the 200 custom programs" by the time the report had been submitted. In November 2017, the total estimated cost to fix the system had increased to $540 million, an amount which the federal auditor general thought was inadequate. A federal union called for the Phoenix system to be scrapped, a call which the government has rejected.

The PSPC has had to pay IBM "additional fees" to "make substantial changes to the software" and hire about 1000 employees to deal with backlogs caused by Phoenix.

The Office of the Auditor General's May 29, 2018 report concluded that three PSPC Phoenix executives were "responsible for delivering the Phoenix pay system" and that the PSPC Deputy Minister "was responsible for ensuring that a governance and oversight mechanism to manage the project was in place, documented, and maintained, and that the project was managed according to its complexity and risk". The Auditor’s report found these executives had the opportunity to provide accurate information to the deputy ministers, including the Deputy Minister of Public Services and Procurement before Phoenix was implemented, but failed to do so.

From 2009 to 2016 when Phoenix was being developed and "up to and including its first wave, three different people served as Deputy Minister." The report stated that, "Considering the broad intricacies and scope of these processes and systems, the Transformation of Pay Administration Initiative has been a large and complex undertaking with substantial risks." By May 2018 there was still a backlog of about 600,000 pay requests at the Public Service Pay Centre.

According to a July 31, 2018 report by the Standing Senate Committee on National Finance, which was chaired by Senator Percy Mockler, (Note: The Standing Senate Committee on National Finance met with "28 witnesses, including the Auditor General of Canada, union representatives, departments and agencies, officials from IBM, the Minister of Public Services and Procurement and the Clerk of the Privy Council" and visited the Miramichi, New Brunswick Public Service Pay Centre office.) the Phoenix system was an "international embarrassment". It had "failed to properly pay nearly half of Canada's workforce of public servants, representing 153,000 people. The report added that the system, whose original 2009 budget was $309-million, had already cost taxpayers $954-million and could rise to $2.2 billion by 2023 in unplanned costs. According to The Globe and Mail, the Standing Committee blamed Harper's Conservative government for creating the "Phoenix mess".

According to a November 8, 2019 Ottawa Citizen article, Pascale Boulay, a Quebec coroner, determined that the 2017 death by suicide of a 52-year-old woman from Val-des-Monts, Quebec, was preventable. The coroner assigned blame on the "flawed Phoenix pay system" that had "led her to emotional and financial ruin." The woman had been employed by the Canada Revenue Agency (CRA). On November 7, 2019, PSAC's national president said that the "case illustrates the mental toll of Phoenix where there is still a backlog of 228,000 instances of pay errors."

In July 2020, the Public Service Alliance of Canada announced a major settlement with the Government of Canada. The settlement involves general damages compensation of $2,500 for all affected employees, an improved compensation process for out-of-pocket expenses and other financial losses caused by Phoenix, and a compensation process for severe impacts such as ruined credit ratings, accumulated interest on loans or credit cards, loss of security clearance due to bankruptcy, mental anguish and trauma, or loss of savings from cashing in investments such as RRSPs to pay debts.

In July 2024, Government of Canada announced the latest goal to clear all Phoenix backlogged cases by 2025, at a cost of $963 million.

== Problems and impacts on employees ==
By October 2016, among the employees affected, the greatest concentration of pay errors affected those employees with changes in position or status, and those with supplementary payments, such as overtime. Students, new hires, seasonal, temporary and terminated employees were therefore particularly affected, as have those taking or coming back from leave which includes maternity and medical. Issues with health and dental benefits, disability claims, and insurance benefits were also a concern. In some instances, employees have not received their pay altogether. This includes a former CRA employee who received multiple paychecks totaling $0.00. As a result of Phoenix incorrectly generating her paystubs, said employee's house was foreclosed on by her bank.

Even after retiring from the Federal Public Service, some past employees are still attempting to apprehend missing pay, and in some case, paying back debt to the federal government due to previous overpayments. Current and past employees have reported that the inconsistencies in their pay has negatively impacted their mental health. To remove themselves from the stress and anxiety that Phoenix has caused them, some employees have opted for early retirement, surrendering their full pensions.

=== Causes ===
There have been several causes put forward for Phoenix's problems. Government managers have blamed the lack of training for employees, particularly those in the new Miramichi pay centre. Federal unions have blamed IBM, drawing comparisons with the 2010 Queensland Health payroll problems, which also involved IBM, and eventually cost $1.2 billion. The former Conservative government has been blamed for cutting employees too quickly and under-spending on training. The Liberal government has been blamed for rolling out the system too quickly and ignoring warning signs.

== Replacement ==
In May 2019 the federal government named three companies that will compete to replace the Phoenix pay system. In 2018, the government had announced a plan to eventually scrap Phoenix, but only after a new system with improved technology is put in place. The new system needs to be adjustable and able to change with new technology and government needs, contrasting the Phoenix pay system which had to be adapted frequently.

The three companies chosen to compete as the replacement are as follows: Ceridian (a US-based pay systems specialist with offices across Canada), SAP (a German multinational that creates business management software), and Workday (a US-based cloud applications provider). All three companies were on a short list of five vendors released in 2018.

The Treasury Board’s reasoning for picking three finalists was to give the government flexibility in their decision to make sure they had options in the event they need to pivot to a different solution. Although one of the companies was to be picked for replacing the Phoenix pay system, the other remaining companies could still be used for different elements. Once a new system is picked, they will need to implement it in a way in which it can run while the old Phoenix system is being slowly eliminated.

Ceridian, a global human capital management software company which has a flagship cloud-based human capital management platform called Dayforce, won an eight-year, $16.9-million contract in 2021.

Since awarding the contract in 2021, a special committee named the Next Generation HR and Pay Joint Union Management Committee was created to "advance the mutual goal of discussing and identifying opportunities and considerations for a potential Next Generation HR and Pay solution as early in the process as possible and before formative decisions are implemented". This committee is made up of a combination of union representatives and federal government representatives. The committee was established to tackle issues, including but not limited to "identifying problematic areas and gaps with regard to Next Generation HR and Pay activities and developing specific solutions, strategies and approaches to address these problems". The committee will operate in a consulting capacity, and has stated "To consult does not imply unanimous or majority agreement. Where consensus cannot be reached, the reason will be documented." Furthermore, "Outcomes and discussions of the committee will not replace existing legislation or collective agreements". The main objective of this committee also includes simplifying the pay rules for public servants, in order to reduce the complexity of the development of Phoenix's replacement. This complexity of the current pay rules is a result of "negotiated rules for pay and benefits over 60 years that are specific to each of over 80 occupational groups in the public service." making it difficult to develop a single solution which can handle each occupational groups specific needs.

In June 2025, a ten-year contract worth $350.6 million was awarded to Ceridan for the Dayforce platform, with a ten-year extension option available.

== See also ==
- British Post Office scandal
- Software bug
