= Phoenix (comics) =

Phoenix, in comics, may refer to:

- Phoenix, the alias used by a number of Marvel Comics characters connected with the Phoenix Force
  - Jean Grey, who initially used the alias Marvel Girl in the X-Men
  - Rachel Summers, Jean Grey's daughter from an alternate future who is a member of X-Men and Excalibur
  - Phoenix Force, a character from an alternative future who joins the Guardians of the Galaxy
- Phoenix (manga), a manga series by Osamu Tezuka
- The Phoenix (comics), a weekly British comic that began in 2012
- Phoenix, later called the Protector, a character from Atlas/Seaboard Comics
- Phoenix, the first alias used by Marvel supervillain Helmut Zemo

== See also ==
- Phoenix (disambiguation)
