= Phenix =

Phenix or Phénix may refer to:

== Buildings ==
- Phenix Baptist Church, West Warwick, Rhode Island, formerly on the National Register of Historic Places
- Phenix Building (Chicago), an office building, demolished in 1957
- De Phenix, Marrum, a smock mill in Marrum, Friesland, Netherlands
- De Phenix, Nes, a smock mill in Nes, Friesland, Netherlands

== Business ==
- Phenix Watch Company, a Swiss watch brand
- Phenix Works, a steel working factory in Flémalle-Haute, Liège, Belgium
- Phenix Cheese Company, maker of Philadelphia cream cheese acquired by Kraft Foods Inc. in 1928

== Musical instruments ==
- Phenix, the name given to the 1954 black Les Paul Custom guitar belonging to Peter Frampton

== Places in the United States ==
- Phenix, Indiana, an unincorporated community
- Phenix, Missouri, an unincorporated community
- Phenix, Virginia, a town
- Phenix City, Alabama
- Phenix Township, Henry County, Illinois

== People ==
- Cindy Phenix (born 1989), Canadian artist
- Erin Phenix (born 1981), American former swimmer and 2000 Olympic champion
- George Perley Phenix (1864–1930), American university president, and educator
- Mike Phenix (born 1989), English retired footballer
- Perry Phenix (born 1974), former National Football League player

== Other uses ==
- PHENIX, a high-energy nuclear interactions experiment held at Brookhaven National Laboratory
- Phénix, French prototype fast breeder reactor in the Marcoule nuclear site
- Phénix, the French word for the phoenix (mythology), an immortal bird in Greek mythology
- "Phenix", a song by Sentenced from the album Amok
- Phenix (album) a 1975 album by jazz saxophonist Cannonball Adderley
- Phenix Aviation Phenix, a Spanish autogyro design
- Phenix High School, Elizabeth City County, Virginia
- French submarine Phénix (Q157), a French Navy submarine commissioned in 1932 and lost in 1939
- Quebec Phenix, a defunct professional women's ice hockey team

== See also ==
- Fenix (disambiguation)
- Penix, an English surname
- Phoenix (disambiguation)
