= Feniks =

Feniks may refer to:

- Feniks Island

== Music ==
- Feniks, charting Polish album by Kasia Cerekwicka 2006
- Feniks, album by Croatian duo Colonia (music group)
- Feniks (Aria album), Russian heavy metal album (2011)

== Other ==
- Yantar-2K satellite
- FC Feniks-Illichovets Kalinine
- FC Feniks Drenas

== See also ==
- Fenix (disambiguation)
- Phoenix (disambiguation)
