= Derek Savage (Christian anarchist) =

British conscientious objector

Derek Stanley Savage (6 March 1917 – 14 October 2007) was an English Christian anarchist, a pacifist poet and critic. British historian David Goodway described him as 'one of the most highly regarded literary critics of the 1940s'. He was General Secretary of the Anglican Pacifist Fellowship from 1960 to 1962.

== Life ==
Savage was born in Essex and brought up in Cheshunt in Hertfordshire. He went to Hertford Grammar School and the Latymer School, Edmonton and then a commercial college. He became a convinced Christian pacifist. In 1938 he married Constance Kiernan. They had six children.

In the Second World War a tribunal accepted his conscientious objection to conscription. In a letter written in 1942, he informed George Orwell that Hitler required "not condemnation, but understanding". In 1947 the family moved to Cornwall, initially to a dilapidated cottage in the Heligan Woods and then into the village of Mevagissey. Savage died in 2007, aged 90.

== Writing and literary activities ==
According to Trevor Tolley, Savage was associated with the following 'leftist' writers in the 1940s: George Woodcock, Alex Comfort, J. F. Hendry, Norman McCaig, Derek Stanford. In Cornwall, his associates included Louis Adeane, Dick Kitto, Mary Lee Settle, W. S. Graham, Nessie Dunsmuir, Frank Baker, Lionel Miskin and Bernie Moss.

His 1944 book The Personal Principle: Studies in modern poetry gave his strong views on contemporary poetry. His controversial critical book The Withered Branch (1950) attacked the twentieth-century novels of Ernest Hemingway, E. M. Forster, Virginia Woolf, Margiad Evans, Aldous Huxley and James Joyce. His last book of poetry, Winter offering: selected poems 1934–1953, was issued by the Leavisite Brynmill Press in 1990.

He contributed chapters to books, for example, Scott 1964, Simmons 1965, Bradbury 1966 and New 1978. Also he contributed many articles, reviews and poems to magazines such as Twentieth Century Verse, Life and letters today and The Phoenix, of which he became European Editor, in succession to Henry Miller. From Mevagissey he contributed many book reviews for The Spectator and Time and Tide.

== Selected publications ==
Savage wrote as 'D.S. Savage'.

=== Articles ===
==== 1930s ====
- "London letter". Poetry. 51 (5): 277–288. 1938. JSTOR 20581238.
- "Poetry politics in London". Poetry. 53 (4): 200–208. 1939. JSTOR 20581623.

==== 1940s ====
- "Tribunal Statement". Now. Autumn. 1940.
- "Harold Monro: A study in integration". Poetry. 60 (6): 324–334. 1942. JSTOR 20583149.
- "Avant-garde and camp followers". Poetry. 59 (1): 32–45. 1941. JSTOR 20582754.
- With George Woodcock, Alex Comfort and George Orwell."Pacifism and the War: A Controversy". Partisan Review. 9 (5): 414–421. 1942.
- "Poetry and nature". Poetry. 61 (3): 496–504. 1942. JSTOR 20583252.
- "Criticism and orthodoxy". Poetry. 64 (5): 279–288. 1944. JSTOR 20583958.
- "Form in modern poetry". Poetry. 65 (1): 30–43. 1944. JSTOR 20584028.
- "The poet's perspectives". Poetry. 64 (3): 148–158. 1944. JSTOR 20583883.
- "The Aestheticism of W. B. Yeats". The Kenyon Review. 7 (1): 118–134. 1945. JSTOR 4332576.
- "The literary situation in England". The Sewanee Review. 53 (4): 654–658. 1945. JSTOR 27537641.
- "Franz Kafka: Faith and vocation". The Sewanee Review. 54 (2): 222–240. 1946. JSTOR 27507625.
- "The poetry of Dylan Thomas". New Republic. Vol. CXIV, no. April 29. 1946. pp. 618, 620, 622.
- "Aldous Huxley and the dissociation of personality". The Sewanee Review. 55 (4): 537–568. 1947. JSTOR 27537772.
- "The Innocence of Evelyn Waugh". Focus Four: 34–35. 1947.
- "The mind of Virginia Woolf". South Atlantic Quarterly. 46 (4): 556–573. 1947. doi:10.1215/00382876-46-4-556.
- "Ernest Hemingway". The Hudson Review. 1 (3): 380–401. 1948. doi:10.2307/3847332. JSTOR 3847332.
- "Letter from England". The Hudson Review. 1 (1): 88–95. 1948. doi:10.2307/3847210. JSTOR 3847210.

==== 1950–1969 ====
- "Dostoevski: The Idea of 'The Gambler'". The Sewanee Review. 58 (2): 281–298. 1950. JSTOR 27537987.
- "A voice in the void". The Kenyon Review. 15 (3): 407–410. 1953. JSTOR 4333428.
- "The Significance of F. Scott Fitzgerald". Arizona Quarterly. 8: 197–210. 1963.

==== 1970s ====
- "An arrow from the Almightie's bow: The political dimension of Christian Pacifism". Theology. 75 (624): 310–319. 1972. doi:10.1177/0040571X7207500605.
- "Death and Evelyn Waugh". Critical Review. 19 (3): 88. 1977.
- "The romantic critic". New Blackfriars. 58 (684): 220–233. 1977. doi:10.1111/j.1741-2005.1977.tb02344.x.
- "Christopher Isherwood: The novelist as homosexual Literature and Psychology Teaneck, NJ". Literature and Psychology Teaneck, NJ. 29 (1–2): 71–88. 1979.

==== 1980s ====
- "Richard Hughes, solipsist". The Anglo-Welsh Review. 68: 36–50. 1981.
- "Richard Hughes, solipsist". The Sewanee Review. 94 (4): 602–613. 1986. JSTOR 27545662.

=== Chapters ===
- Truth and the art of the novel. In 'Scott, Nathan A., ed. (1964). The new Orpheus; essays toward a Christian poetic. New York: Sheed and Ward. pp. 290–304.'
- Testament of a conscientious objector. In 'Simmons, Clifford, ed. (1965). The objectors: The personal story of five conscientious objectors. London: Anthony Gibbs & Phillips. pp. 82–122.'
- E.M. Forster. In 'Bradbury, Malcolm, ed. (1966). E.M Foster A collection of critical essays. Englewood Cliffs, New Jersey: Prentice-Hall. ISBN 978-0-13-329656-3.'
- Anarchism. In 'New, William H., ed. (1978). A political art Essays and images in honour of George Woodcock. Vancouver, B.C.: The University of British Columbia Press. pp. 119–147.'

=== Books ===
- The Autumn World. Poems. With a black and white portrait by Richard Seddon. London, Fortune Press, 1939.
- Don Quixote, and other poems, London, Right Review, 1939.
- A Time to mourn. Poems, 1934–1943. London, Routledge (New Poets series. no. 12). 1943
- The Personal Principle: Studies in modern poetry, London, Routledge, 1944.
- Hamlet & the Pirates: An exercise in literary detection, London, Eyre & Spottiswoode, 1950.
- The Withered Branch: Six studies in the modern novel. London, Eyre & Spottiswoode, 1950.
- The cottager's companion, London, Peter Davies, 1975. ISBN 0-432-14110-3 and paperback edition, London, Mayflower, 1980. ISBN 0-583-12850-5.
- Self-Sufficient Country Living, New York, St Martins Press, 1978, ISBN 0-312-71248-0 (US edition of The Cottager's companion).
- And also much cattle : scenario for four voices, London, Brentham Press, 1975. ISBN 0-9503459-5-4 and, 1993 Harleston, Brynmill Press. ISBN 0-907839-57-6. (Broadcast on the BBC Third Programme on 4 November 1956. The Times, Saturday, 3 November 1956; pg. 4; Issue 53679; col C: "B.B.C. Programmes For The Weekend: Tomorrow.")
- Winter offering : selected poems 1934–1953, Gringley-on-the-Hill, S. Yorks., Brynmill, c.1990. ISBN 0-907839517. Edition of 190 copies.

=== Lyrics of musical works by John Douglas Turner ===
- Dirtying My Thing, c 1970
- Your Mother Thinks I’m a Hoodlum, c 1970
