= Phoenix Marketcity =

Phoenix Marketcity is the name of several shopping malls developed by The Phoenix Mills Co. Ltd. of India, including:

- Phoenix Marketcity (Bengaluru)
- Phoenix Marketcity (Chennai)
- Phoenix Marketcity (Mumbai)
- Phoenix Marketcity, Pune
