= The Phoenix (pacifist journal) =

The Phoenix was founded by James Cooney and his wife, Blanche Cooney (born Rosenthal) in 1938 at an artist's commune in Woodstock, New York. The magazine was originally dedicated to D. H. Lawrence, who had composed the following lines with reference to the mythic creature in 1932:

Are you willing to be sponged out, erased, cancelled,
made nothing?
Are you willing to be made nothing?
dipped into oblivion?
If not, you will never really change.
The phoenix renews her youth
only when she is burnt, burnt alive, burnt down
to hot and flocculent ash.
Then the small stirring of a new small bub in the nest
with strands of down like floating ash
shows that she is renewing her youth like the eagle,
immortal bird.

Lawrence's posthumous papers bore the same name and had been published in 1936.

A pacifist quarterly, The Phoenix was noteworthy for the willingness of its editors to publish material that the mainstream media would consider countercultural, radical, and revolutionary. The writing of Henry Miller, which could find no outlet elsewhere in the United States at the time, was featured in all of the initial issues, as were excerpts from the diaries of Anaïs Nin. The works of writers such as Hervey White, Kay Boyle and Jean Giono were printed in their entirety, as well as the poetry of Robert Duncan, Rayner Heppenstall, Derek Savage, Thomas McGrath, J. C. Crews and William Everson (Brother Antonius).

The Phoenix published until 1940, when France's fall to the Third Reich sounded the death-knell (however temporarily) for peace periodicals in the United States.

== Second series ==
Thirty years later, in 1970, as the Vietnam War spread to Cambodia (and the pacifists grew in number), The Phoenix rose again. Cooney announced the rebirth of his publication in The Massachusetts Review.
