= De Phoenix =

De Phoenix, (also De Phenix or De Fenix) is a name given to some windmills in the Netherlands. The name is usually an indication that a previous mill on the site burnt down.

== De Fenix ==
- De Jong Fenix, Leeuwarden, a windmill in Friesland

== De Phenix ==
- De Phenix, Dokkum, a windmill in Friesland
- De Phenix, Leeuwarden, a windmill in Friesland
- De Phenix, Marrum, a windmill in Friesland
- De Phenix, Nes, a windmill in Friesland

== Phoenix ==
- Phoenix, Zuidwolde, a windmill in Groningen
