= M. O. Penix =

American politician in Arkansas

M. O. Penix (? – 1955) was an American politician. He was a state legislator in Arkansas who served in the Arkansas House of Representatives from 1911 to 1913. He was a proponent of prohibition and opposed women's suffrage, claiming "women accoutered with liquor constitute a greater threat to the sanctity of our self-government than does the socialist". Although there was support for prohibition at the time, his proposals failed to pass, and he lost reelection in 1912.
