= Theater Phönix =

Coordinates: 48.291194°N 14.297139°E

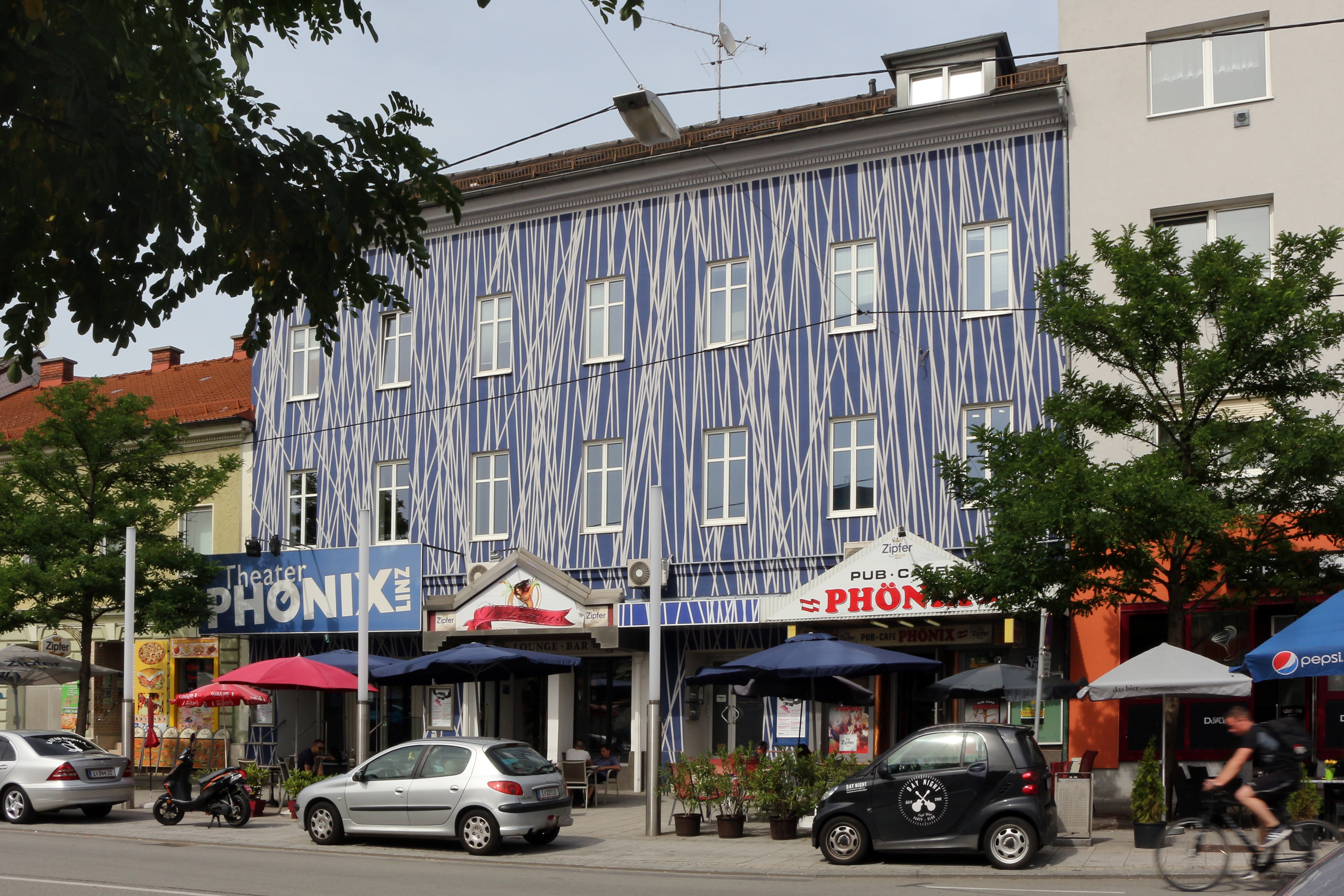
- Interactive map of the Theater Phönix area

General information
- Type: Theatre
- Location: Linz, Austria
- Opened: 1989

Theater Phönix is a theatre in Linz, Upper Austria, founded in 1989.
