= Pam Pinnock =

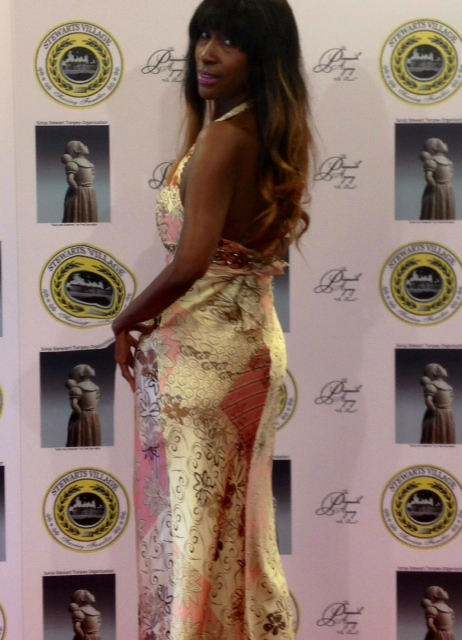
- Born: Pam Pinnock; December 27, 1973 (age 51); Panorama City, Los Angeles, California, USA
- Occupation: Publicist
- Years active: 1991–present
- Website: www.pampinnock.com

Pam Pinnock (born December 27, 1973, in Pearls, Mississippi) is an American author and publicist. She is an African American. Her interest in publicity comes from working with actor and comedian Eddie Murphy when she was only fifteen years old. A former journalist turned author upon scribing the memoir The Father Fracture published on October 12, 2007. The memoir describes her abusive relationship with her lover undisputed heavyweight champion Mike Tyson. Her 2007 autobiography spanned the first twenty-five years of her life, beginning with her abusive upbringing. The Father Fracture was published by independent publishing house Healeth Publisher. Pinnock has been featured in many magazines and newspapers including Rolling Out Magazine, All Hip Hop.com, ET Online Entertainment. She has worked with Jay-Z, singer John Legend, Ludacris, actor Bokeem Woodbine, Gary Dourdan and rapper DMX (rapper), Gucci Mane, Jagged Edge, BET Hip Hop Awards. Pinnock has completed her second novel slated for a 2013 release. Pinnock owns a PR firm, The Pinnock Agency, headquartered in New York.

== Career ==
Publicist and CEO of The Pinnock Agency, a public relations firm with offices in Los Angeles. She now lives with her family in New York.
