= Phoenix Inn =

Listed pub in York, England

- The pub in 2025
- Former names: Labour in Vain
- Alternative names: The Phoenix

General information
- Type: Public house
- Location: 75 George Street, York, England
- Coordinates: 53.95413°N 1.07507°W
- Year built: Late 18th century
- Renovated: 1897 (remodelled); 1999 (restored); 2009 (refurbished)

Design and construction
- Designations

Listed Building – Grade II
- Official name: The Phoenix public house
- Designated: 14 March 1997
- Reference no.: 1257774

Website
- phoenixinnyork.co.uk

The Phoenix Inn is a Grade II listed public house on George Street in York, England, standing just inside the city walls. The building is variously dated to the late 18th or early 19th century and was remodelled in 1897 for John Smith's Brewery to designs by Bromet & Thorman of Tadcaster. It later passed to Marston's, under whose ownership it experienced several closures in the 2000s before being sold at auction in 2008 to private owners. As of March 2026, the freehold remains in independent ownership.

== History ==
The public house stands on George Street, just inside the city walls. The official listing dates the building to the late 18th century, although an RCHME survey in 1981 places it in the first half of the 19th century. It was remodelled in 1897, when it was owned by John Smith's Brewery, with the work carried out to designs by Bromet & Thorman of Tadcaster. The Phoenix Inn is the only remaining pub inside the city walls associated with the former cattle market, held within Fishergate Bar until 1827.

According to The Press, the pub's name likely derives from the former Phoenix Iron Foundry in the area. Earlier in its history it was known as the Labour in Vain.

In 1968 the site was included within the newly established Central Historic Core conservation area, and on 14 March 1997, the Phoenix Inn was designated a Grade II listed building. A restoration in 1999, guided by specialist advice arranged through the Campaign for Real Ale (CAMRA), received a national conservation award, and a further refurbishment in 2009 by the new family owners was carried out with similar respect for the building's Victorian character. CAMRA regards the Phoenix Inn as having an interior of "very special national historic interest", and it is rated two stars in the organisation's grading scheme.

The pub closed in November 2006 after the landlord went bankrupt. It reopened in March 2007 but shut again in December that year. The Phoenix opened once more in January 2008 with a caretaker landlord, but closed and was boarded up in February 2008 after owners Marston's said it was not taking enough money. It suffered an arson attack in August 2008. In November 2008, it was reportedly sold at auction by Marston's to a couple from Whitby. As of March 2026, the pub's freehold remains in independent ownership. In September 2026, plans to refurbish the windows and replace the front door and gates at the Phoenix Inn were approved by City of York Council.

== Architecture ==
The building is of orange‑brown brick, with the front and side elevations finished in incised stucco and the rear in garden‑wall brickwork; the inn front is timber, and the roof is pantiled with brick stacks. The frontage has two storeys and three bays, with the inn front set between plain pilasters and a shaped cornice. It includes a six‑panel door with a small‑pane overlight and a three‑light window with coloured glass above a tiled base. To one side is a segmental carriage arch closed by paired timber gates. The upper windows are two‑light bays on brackets, and a pub sign is set above the arch. At the rear, a two‑storey elevation of three windows stands behind a single‑storey lean‑to, with simple one‑pane sash windows.

=== Interior ===
The public bar in 2023

The front bar layout, with its former smoke room, side corridor and top‑glazed screen, follows the 1897 plans prepared for John Smith's by Bromet & Thorman. The bar itself has red leather seating, polished tables and timber panelling linked to the old railway carriage works, and the bow‑fronted counter was restored around 2022. The glazed partition continues around to separate the bar from the servery, which retains an older bar‑back fitting.

Beyond the front rooms, the passage widens to form a lobby bar with a fielded‑panel counter topped in copper and bench seating nearby. The toilets keep wall tiling from the inter‑war period. At the rear, a room opened to the passage has further bench seating, a hatch to the back of the servery and a cast‑iron fireplace. A small adjoining space, once reached by a staircase now removed, contains a bar billiards table and a window that formerly served as a hatch.

== See also ==
- Listed buildings in York (within the city walls, southern part)
