= The Phoenix Project (San Francisco) =

Nonprofit advocacy group in San Francisco, California

- Formation: February 2024; 1 year ago
- Headquarters: San Francisco, California
- President: Julie Pitta
- Vice President: Anabel Ibanez
- Secretary: Keane Chukwuneta
- Executive Director & Treasurer: Jeremy Mack
- Board of directors: Hope Williams
- Website: https://www.phoenixprojectnow.com/

The Phoenix Project is a nonprofit advocacy group in San Francisco, California.

== Overview ==
The Phoenix Project was formed in February 2024 by Julie Pitta and Jeremy Mack. The group is a progressive group, formed as a reaction to "wealthy tech moguls and billionaires," who "are funding moderate political action committees." The group tracks "money and influence in San Francisco politics."

== Activities ==
As part of the organization's mission to "Uncover San Francisco's dark money trail," the group published a series of white papers detailing large amounts of money in San Francisco politics. In those white papers, The Phoenix Project detailed $33 million raised to influence politics in the city from 2020 through the 2024 election, noting that "that more than half of that—$18 million—is 'dark money,' meaning the donors are never disclosed."

When, in February 2025, newly elected mayor Daniel Lurie gathered a group of wealthy business leaders to advise him about San Francisco city politics, The Phoenix Project described it as "extremely disappointing" and "a largely Pacific Heights crowd” in reference to the wealthy Pacific Heights neighborhood the mayor resides in.
