= 2010 Queensland Health payroll system implementation =

Failed payroll replacement project

The 2010 Queensland Health payroll system implementation was a disastrous payroll and HR system replacement project that affected Queensland Health, the public health system in Queensland, Australia. The new payroll system was delivered by IBM based on SAP and Workbrain technology, and replaced the former LATTICE payroll system.

The new system went live on 14 March 2010 despite known issues with the system and incomplete testing. Almost 78,000 Queensland Health staff received inaccurate pay, or no pay at all, for a number of months due to serious system defects. These defects, delays and other issues resulted in the total end-of-project cost being $181 million, with an estimated ongoing cost to repair, maintain and operate the system of around $1.2 billion over eight years.

In 2012, the newly elected Liberal National government through the governor-in-council opened the Queensland Health Payroll System Commission of Inquiry to investigate the cause and consequences of the troubled system and processes. In his final report, the commissioner, The Hon Richard Chesterman AO RFD QC, stated that "The replacement of the QH payroll system must take a place in the front rank of failures in public administration in this country. It may be the worst."

== History and parties ==
=== Context ===
On 1 July 2003, the Queensland Government formally established the Shared Services Initiative to centralise payroll and human resources functions from across government under one agency. CorpTech, a business unit of the Queensland Treasury, was established to "design and build a whole-of-government human resources and finance solution with a capital budget of $125 million." Queensland Health was to be included in this whole-of-government platform, and by March 2006, management of the existing payroll system had been transferred to CorpTech.

A report in March 2007 found that CorpTech had failed to deliver any significant progress thus far, and had engaged an extreme number of contractors on favourable payment schedules from a number of private organisations, including Accenture, Logica and IBM. In response, government under-treasurer Gerard Bradley commissioned a review to investigate potential actions. From this review, the concept of a single private vendor for the new systems arose - called the "Prime Contractor Model".

=== Procurement ===
The procurement process for the whole-of-government systems replacement was complex and not-standardised. It consisted of three components: a "request for information", a "request for proposal", and a final "invitation to offer". The invitation to offer (ITO) stage represents the final procurement and contract-forming process. Of the ten companies approached during the request for information, only four responded: IBM, Logica, Accenture and SAP. These four companies were then presented with the request for proposal, which was confused for the contract-forming process. Finally, the ITO was issued on 12 September 2007, by which time SAP had withdrawn its proposal. IBM was the successful tenderer and entered into a $98 million contract with the state of Queensland on 5 December 2007.

By October 2008, the Prime Contractor Model had proven unsuccessful with IBM failing to have delivered any of the agreed products of the contract despite having already been paid almost a third of the contract value. IBM approached the state government, stating that it would need a total of $181 million, almost twice the original contract value, to deliver the scope of works required.

By 1 July 2008, the former Queensland Health LATTICE payroll system had fallen out of support from the vendor and was effectively unsupported outside of in-house technical capabilities. Replacement of the LATTICE system had become an urgent priority. The state government subsequently modified the scope of the contract to remain at $98 million, however only be for the delivery of an 'interim' Queensland Health payroll system to replace LATTICE until a new whole-of-government system was developed.

=== Queensland Health Payroll System Commission of Inquiry ===
Following the disastrous system development and implementation works, the Queensland Government established a Commission of Inquiry. On 13 December 2012, the governor in council made order for the Queensland Health Payroll System Commission of Inquiry (QHPSCI). The Inquiry sought to investigate and understand the factors that led to the failed payroll system implementation, and the extent of the damages to the Queensland Government and health staff. The Inquiry began on 1 February 2013, and delivered its final report to the premier on 31 July 2013.

The report detailed systematic failings at all levels and on both the procurer and vendor sides of the project, including a lack of governance, budgetary failings, system faults and incomplete testing and assurance.

The Queensland Health Payroll System Commission of Inquiry (QHPSCI) was established by order of the Governor in Council on 13 December 2012. The Honourable Richard Chesterman AO RFD QC commenced the Inquiry on 1 February 2013. In his remarks at the directions hearing, Commissioner Chesterman explained the purpose of the inquiry "is to determine why such large amounts of money have been lost to the public, whether anything might be recovered; and why such distress was inflicted on the Queensland Health workforce."

QHPSCI's public hearings began on Monday 11 March 2013 with phase one focusing on the "Tender Process". The second phase, examining the 'Contract' with IBM, commenced on 22 April 2013. The third and final phase, "Settlement", began on Monday 27 May 2013. The former Premier and two ex-ministers were called to give evidence during this phase. A special hearing was held on the 18 June 2013 to deal with late information submitted to the Commission. The QHPSCI presented its findings to the Premier on 31 July 2013.

== System development and implementation ==
On 14 March 2010, Queensland Health went live with the new payroll system. In the final report from the Commission of Inquiry, the commissioner states that:

The system did not perform adequately with terrible consequences for the employees of QH and equally serious financial consequences for the State. After many months of anguished activity during which employees of QH endured hardship and uncertainty, a functioning payroll system was developed, but it is very costly.

— The Honourable Richard N Chesterman AO RFD QC, Final Report of the Queensland Health Payroll System Commission of Inquiry, page 12, section 2.14

The payroll system failed to accurately calculate or pay all 78,000 Queensland Health staff, resulting in over- and under-payments exceeding $300 million. The system performed exceptionally poorly, including paying staff that had left the organisation months prior, and exhibiting critical data errors that should not have been technically possible resulting in entire pay runs being frozen.

== Causes ==
The Queensland Health Payroll System Commission of Inquiry identified a large number of contributing factors and causes, all of which resulted in the eventual failed delivery of the payroll system and the under-, over- or non-payment of Queensland Health's workforce.

=== Unfair and improper vendor bidding ===
It was discovered in the Commission of Inquiry that IBM, the successful tenderer of the payroll system, had acted improperly and corruptly in forming and submitting its tender to the government. The commission found that key IBM staff had been provided confidential information by CorpTech executives relating to the available budget, and that it had used its pre-existing system access from other projects to retrieve internal government documents related to the tender. Additionally, IBM staff improperly accessed the proposals of its competitors

The commission noted that had CorpTech been aware of these failures, IBM would have been automatically excluded from the procurement process. In August 2008, following the failures of the project, the Queensland Government barred IBM from tendering on all government contracts until it could demonstrate reformed governance and systematic organisational change.

=== Acceptance testing and product delivery ===
During acceptance testing, a core component of the 'hand over' of the solution from IBM to Queensland Health, several thousand system and technical defects were found. During testing stages three and four (the final two stages), more than 2,000 defects were identified, including some 14 critical "showstopper" defects and around 1500 severe defects. During the Commission of Inquiry, IBM insisted that the volume of defects was irrelevant and that the nature of the defects was the only important factor. IBM was found to have significantly misrepresented the quality and integrity of the system, and had not resolved defects as claimed when it had progressed to final stage acceptance testing.

=== Decision to go live ===
Despite knowledge from both the vendors and Queensland Health that the system was unlikely to accurately pay staff, the state continued to go live with the system in March 2010. In the Commission of Inquiry, Queensland Health noted that IBM stated it could correct all defects that would affect pay accuracy. It was also stated that this decision to go live was made on the balance of numerous known issues with the new system and the concern that the historic LATTICE system would fail in its entirety before another go live could occur.

At this stage, the go live of the system had already been delayed more than ten times.

== Consequences ==
=== Pay accuracy ===
The problem was not resolved by May, with 35,000 wage anomalies to be fixed, but some progress had been made.

=== Organisational efficiency ===
The system is very labor-intensive and requires ten times the staff as other systems. It is estimated to cost $1.2B before 2018 when it is recommended to be replaced. According to the 2013 Commission of Inquiry, "the QH payroll system must take a place in the front rank of failures in public administration in this country".

The new payroll system requires around 1,000 payroll processing staff to operate for the magnitude of staff members required to be paid under the system, a 40% increase versus for former LATTICE system.

== Settlement ==
Following the troubled launch of the system, the state sought damages from IBM for failing to deliver the stated products of its contract. Advice provided by Queensland Government lawyers found that the government could sue IBM for damages totalling $88 million.

On 23 November 2010, the Queensland Government announced that it had settled with IBM and will spend $209 million over three years to resolve the payroll problems.
