= BAE Systems Phoenix =

Retired British unmanned aerial vehicle

Phoenix
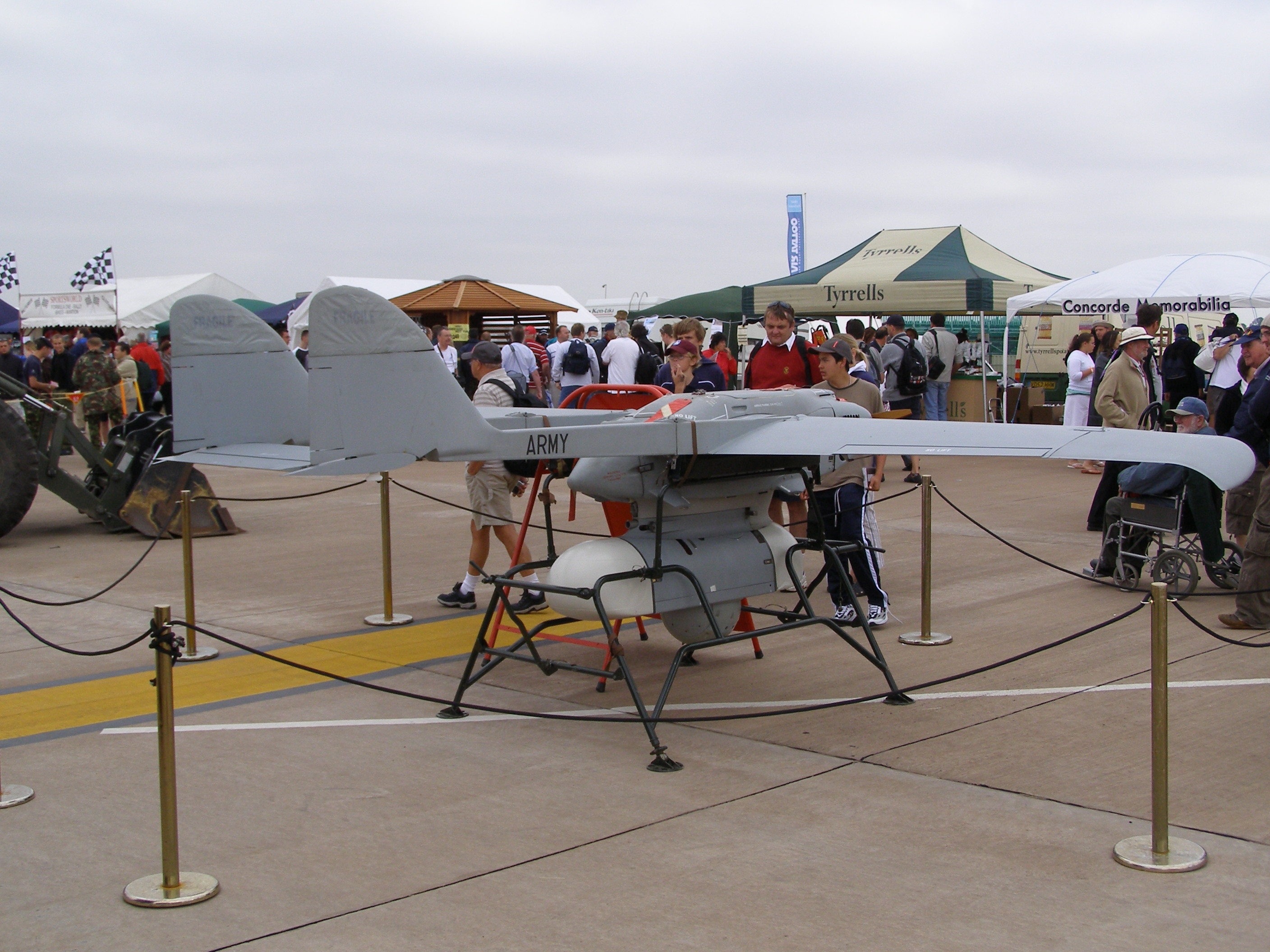
- British Army Phoenix

General information
- Type: Reconnaissance UAV
- National origin: United Kingdom
- Manufacturer: BAE Systems

History
- First flight: 1986
- Retired: 2008

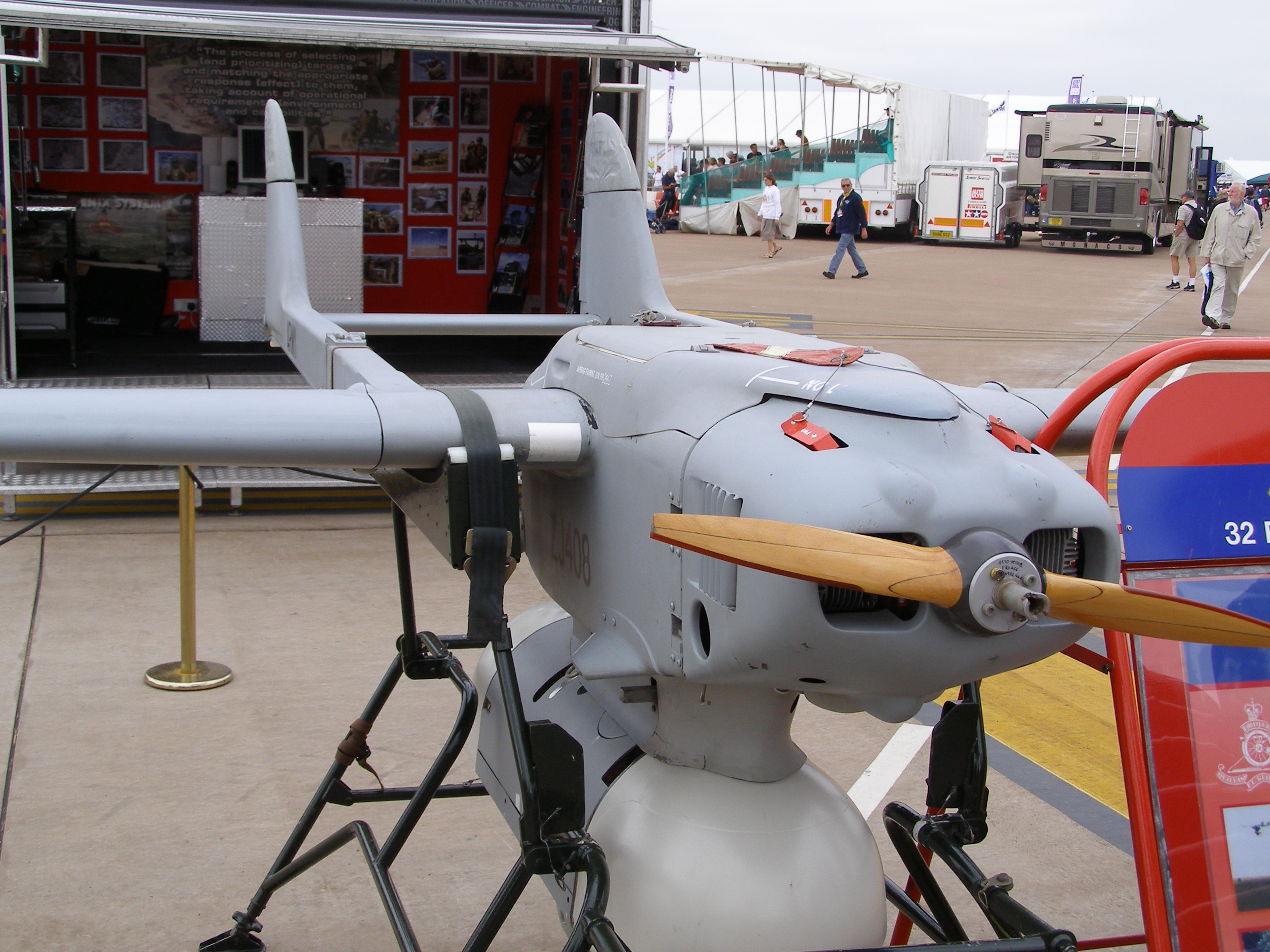
British Army Phoenix

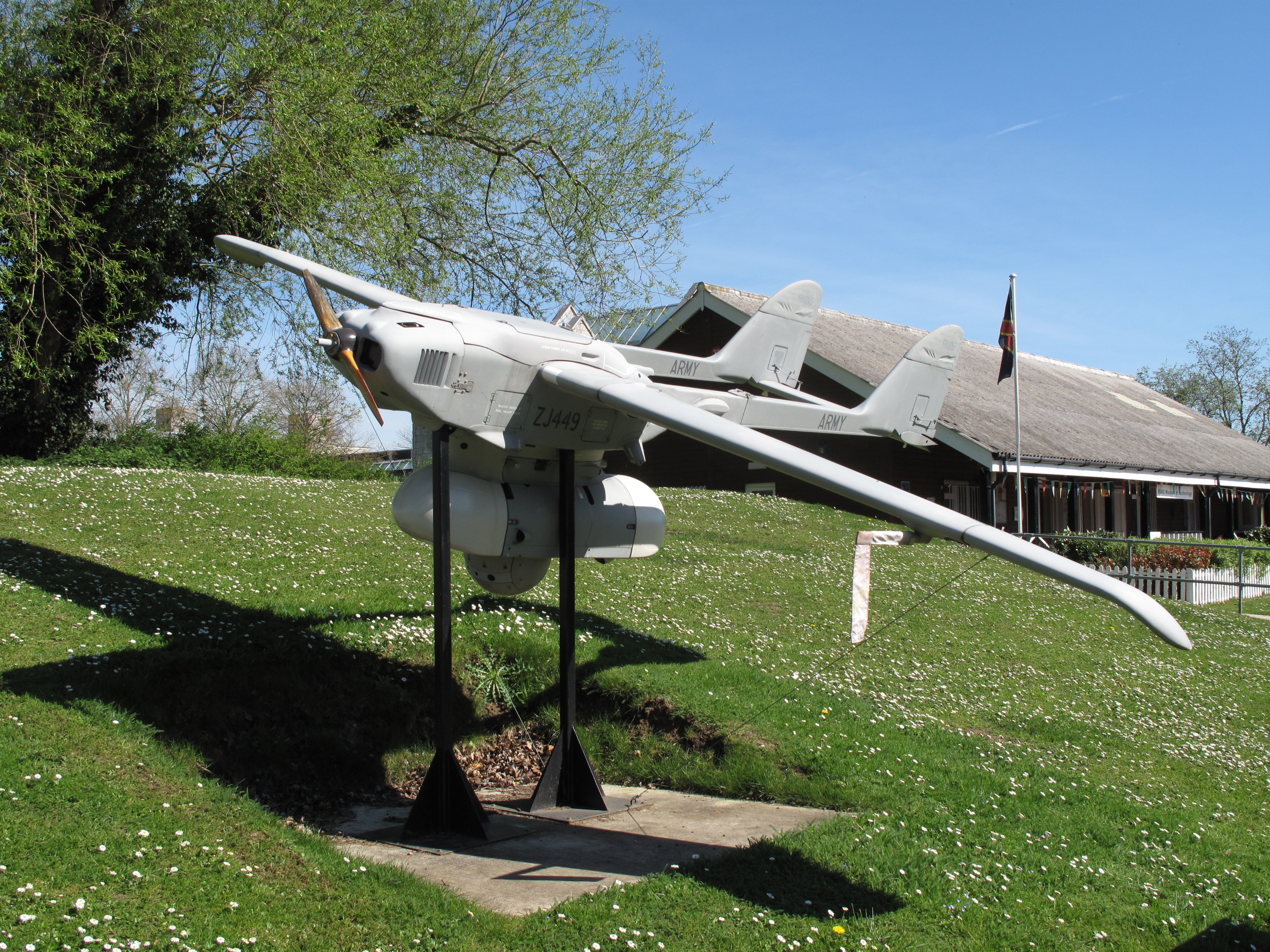
Phoenix displayed at the former REME Museum of Technology site at Arborfield

The BAE Systems Phoenix (originally GEC-Marconi Phoenix) was an all-weather, day or night, real-time surveillance Unmanned Air Vehicle. It had a twin-boom UAV with a surveillance pod, from which the imagery was data linked to a ground control station (GCS) that also controlled the aircraft in flight. It was the third generation of UAV in British Army service with the Royal Artillery after SD/1 and Canadair Midge.

The Phoenix was a typical combat surveillance UAV, powered by a 20 kW (26 hp) piston engine, but is distinctive in that it is a "tractor" aircraft, with the propeller in the front. This tends to obstruct a sensor turret, and so the sensor payload, built around an infrared imager, was carried in a pod slung well under the fuselage. Phoenix was made of Kevlar and other plastics.

Phoenix was 'zero-length' launch being projected into the air from a launch-rail mounted on the back of a truck. The launch rail having been originally developed for the US Army Aquilla UAV that failed to enter service. The Phoenix was recovered by parachute, landing on its back, with a crushable "hump" on the back taking up the impact. The zero-length take-off and landing was an essential requirement for operating in NATO's Central Region and deployment in a forward divisional area. Maximum flight time was around 4 hours.

Phoenix sensors provided imagery direct to the GCS where it was analysed and reported to artillery headquarters, to command level, or to a Phoenix troop command post. The principal method of communication from the GCS to artillery on the ground was via the Battlefield Artillery Target Engagement System (BATES). The UAV could be launched within an hour of reaching its launch site. A second UAV can be launched within a further eight minutes and up to two UAVs can be controlled from the same ground station.

The name Phoenix was taken from Project Phoenix, a late 1970s study into surveillance and target acquisition needs after cancellation of the unsuccessful development of Westland MRUASTAS to replace AN/USD501 Midge. The first flight was in 1986, with an expectation that it would enter service in 1989, but the project suffered from numerous delays. The Phoenix eventually entered service in 1999, and saw limited operational use as part of the British contribution to Kosovo Force (KFOR) and in Iraq as part of Operation Telic. Phoenix attrition was high during the Iraq campaign, though British Army officials say it gave excellent service for artillery spotting, stating that some of the losses were due to deliberate sacrifices, in which the UAV was kept on station beyond the time it could be recovered rather than let targets get away. The system was operated by the 32nd Regiment Royal Artillery and 39th Regiment Royal Artillery

The final operational sortie was conducted in May 2006, although it was not formally retired until 20 March 2008. An international competition designated "Watchkeeper" was set up for a next-generation UAV system in 2002. A group led by Thales Group of France won the competition in late 2004, with the system built around the Elbit Hermes 180 tactical UAV and Elbit Hermes 450 endurance UAV, the Watchkeeper WK450 system. An interim system, Hermes 450, was deployed operationally in 2007. The 32nd Regiment Royal Artillery also uses the Desert Hawk UAV.

== Specifications ==
General characteristics

- Crew: None
- Capacity: 110 lb (50 kg) payload
- Wingspan: 18 ft 0 in (5.6 m)
- Gross weight: 386 lb (175 kg)
- Powerplant: 1 × Weslake Aero Engines WAE 342 , 25 hp (19 kW)

Performance

- Maximum speed: 104 mph (166 km/h, 90 kn)
- Endurance: 5 hours
- Service ceiling: 9,000 ft (2,800 m)

== See also ==
- Twin-boom aircraft

Related lists

- List of unmanned aerial vehicles
