= Phoenix Theatre =

Phoenix Theatre may refer to:

== Places ==
=== England ===
- Cockpit Theatre, 17th century theatre in London called the Phoenix after a fire
- Phoenix Cinema, London
- Phoenix Dance Theatre, a dance company in Leeds
- Phoenix Picturehouse, Oxford
- Phoenix Theatre, London, a West End theatre
- Sue Townsend Theatre, formerly the Phoenix Theatre, in Leicester

=== United States ===
- Phoenix Theatre (New York City), an off-Broadway theatre (1953–1982)
- Phoenix Theatre (Indianapolis), a professional alternative theatre
- Phoenix Theatre (Phoenix), a regional theatre
- Phoenix Theater, an all-ages club in Petaluma, California

=== Canada ===
- Phoenix Concert Theatre, Toronto

=== Italy ===
- La Fenice (The Phoenix), an opera house in Venice, Italy

=== Australia ===
- Phoenix Theatre, Coniston, a regional community theatre in Coniston, Wollongong

== See also ==
- Cockpit Theatre in London (extant 1616 – c. 1665), formally named The Phoenix
