= USS Phoenix =

USS Phoenix may refer to the following ships of the United States Navy:

- USS Phoenix (1841), a 2-gun schooner, built in 1841 and sold in 1853
- USS Phoenix (1861), an American wooden whaler based in New London, Connecticut, sunk as a breakwater in 1861
- USS Phoenix (CL-46), a Brooklyn-class light cruiser, transferred to Argentina in 1951, and sunk during the Falklands War
- USS Phoenix (AG-172), a Phoenix-class miscellaneous auxiliary, transferred to the Military Sea Transportation Service and re-registered as USNS Phoenix. Sold to the Philippines in 1973
- USS Phoenix (SSN-702), a Los Angeles-class submarine, decommissioned and stricken in 1998
