= Phoenix High School =

Phoenix High School may refer to:

== United States ==
- ASU Preparatory Academy, Phoenix High School, Phoenix, Arizona
- Phoenix High School (Lincoln, California), Lincoln, California
- Phoenix High School (San Jose, California), San Jose, California
- Phoenix High School, a Small Learning Community within Rancho Cotate High School in Rohnert Park, California
- Phoenix High School (Dalton, Georgia)
- Phoenix High School (Lawrenceville, Georgia)
- Phoenix High School (Louisiana), Braithwaite, Louisiana
- Phoenix High School (Michigan), Kalamazoo, Michigan
- Phoenix High School (New York), Phoenix, New York
- Phoenix High School (Oregon), Phoenix, Oregon

== United Kingdom ==
- Phoenix High School, London, UK

== See also ==
- Phoenix Indian School, later Phoenix Indian High School, Phoenix, Arizona
