= The Phoenix Project (film) =

- Directed by: Tyler Graham Pavey
- Written by: Tyler Graham Pavey
- Produced by: Mike Mo; Tyler Graham Pavey; Orson Ossman
- Starring: Corey Rieger; Andrew Simpson; David Pesta; Orson Ossman
- Cinematography: Alan Dean
- Edited by: Gray Clevenger
- Music by: Henry Allen
- Production company: The Ironwood Gang
- Distributed by: FilmBuff
- Release date: January 16, 2015
- Running time: 92 minutes
- Country: United States
- Language: English
- Budget: $60,000

The Phoenix Project is a 2015 American science fiction film written and directed by Tyler Graham Pavey. Corey Rieger, Andrew Simpson, David Pesta, and Orson Ossman star as scientists who attempt to reanimate the dead.

== Plot ==
Perry Frank assembles a team of four young scientists to take part in an experiment to reanimate the dead. The group consists of himself, his friend and protege Carter Watts, biologist Devin Fischer, and engineer Ampersand "Amps" Garner. Although Devin and Amps are privately dubious about Carter's usefulness, the team members express their optimism and excitement for the project in taped interviews that Perry arranges. Perry explains that their funding only allows for five subjects, so they must proceed slowly and carefully. As they set up the equipment, Amps and Carter bond. Devin confides to Perry that his father, a scientist, experienced his greatest regret in having his work finished by later teams, and Devin says he wants to push this experiment all the way.

Their first subject is an insect. When the experiment fails, Devin suggests that since the experiment was designed around mammals, they should abandon tests on insects. Perry reluctantly agrees, and Amps recalibrates the equipment for a mouse. Carter, initially supportive of the idea, becomes reluctant when it comes time to kill the mouse, which the others refused to let him name. The experiment is once again a failure. Carter and Devin give up for the day, but Amps convinces Perry to set up a second test on the same subject. Amps becomes demoralized when this also results in failure. When Carter walks through the lab that night, he notices the mouse's body has moved. He excitedly wakes the others, and they celebrate. Carter later approaches Perry privately and cautiously suggests that one of the team members may have moved the mouse to raise morale. Perry reassures him that he has the situation under control.

Further tests prove failures. Frustrated, Devin requests Carter contact the grant organization and request money for more tests. Carter is incensed when he finds that Perry has lied to them; there is no grant, and Perry is bankrolling the experiment privately. Carter quits the project, citing legal and moral implications, though Devin elects to stay. Perry and Devin do not explain the situation to Amps. Devin pushes for a larger mammal, which he says will be easier to test, and Perry allows the use of a rabbit, though he cautions Devin that to maintain public acceptance they must avoid animal testing on anything larger. Devin and Perry become further estranged when Perry learns Devin has joined to project for personal reasons – his sister is near death, and Devin intends to reanimate her. Perry angrily reminds Devin that human experimentation is not possible.

After promising results, Amps' updated calculations reveal that the second subject, the mouse, could not have moved. Perry admits that he moved the mouse himself, and Amps says that he needs time away from the project. Devin pushes Perry to perform another test without Amps, and they experience their first unqualified success. Although initially angry they would operate his machine without permission, Amps also becomes excited. Perry contacts Carter, apologizes for lying about the grant, and requests that he rejoin them. Carter returns once he hears about their success. Meanwhile, Devin convinces Amps to secretly test on a human subject. When Perry finds out, he threatens to call the police. Seeing no alternative, Devin commits suicide to force them to test the machine on him. The result is initially a success, but the others are quickly horrified to learn that Devin's memory and personality have been wiped; he does not even understand how to speak. Perry orders them to destroy the equipment, and they leave the lab with Devin in tow. As they put him in a car, Devin stares wide-eyed at the world around him.

== Cast ==
- Corey Rieger as Perry Frank
- Andrew Simpson as Devin Fischer
- David Pesta as Ampersand Garner
- Orson Ossman as Carter Watts

== Production ==
The $60,000 budget was raised partially through crowdfunding on Kickstarter.

== Release ==
The Phoenix Project premiered on video on demand and had a limited theatrical release on January 16, 2015.

== Reception ==
Frank Scheck of The Hollywood Reporter wrote that "while it earns points for its thoughtful, non-exploitative approach to its subject, [it] is neither brainy enough to attract sci-fi aficionados nor fast-paced enough to please horror fans". Film Journal International wrote, "This melancholy take on the Frankenstein story should play well with horror buffs who prefer character conflict to rampaging creatures and gore, but its low-key virtues make break-out appeal unlikely." Michael Rechtshaffen of the Los Angeles Times called it "a technically impressive but talky sci-fi drama that never quite comes to life". Joe Friar of the Victoria Advocate wrote, "The lack of tension proves to be the movie's weakness and at times it feels like the little brother to the excellent 2004 film Primer".
