= Newsbrief =

British Broadcasting Company news magazine

Newsbrief was the working title for a planned international news magazine, developed under the codename Project Phoenix by the British Broadcasting Corporation (BBC). The project was to be BBC Magazines' largest-ever investment when released in 2007. The original 2006 release date was pushed back. The magazine was to be tied closely with the BBC's flagship current affairs programme, Newsnight. In 2006, BBC Magazines' sales director Ashley Munday moved into a new development role in preparation for the launching of the magazine. Peter Phippen, BBC Magazines' managing director had planned on the release of a news-based magazine since mid-1990s.

PATA was expected to correspond with BBC World for Project Phoenix on a subproject, Travel Profiles, to promote Asian-Pacific travel. Other promotions were to be done by CNN International and National Geographic, and in print titles such as Time, Fortune, and Newsweek. Australia, Canada, Taipei, Hong Kong, India, Macau, Malaysia and Singapore were to be the biggest contributors to the project.
