= Phoenix (surname) =

Phoenix is surname of northern British origin, a variant of the surname Fenwick. Notable people with the surname include:

- Arlyn Phoenix (born 1944), American activist
- Charles Phoenix (born 1962), American historian/humorist
- Nick Phoenix (born 1967), British composer
- Joaquin Phoenix (born 1974), American actor, producer and musician
- Pat Phoenix (1923–1986), British actress
- Rain Phoenix (born 1972), American actress
- River Phoenix (1970–1993), American actor, musician and activist.
- Summer Phoenix (born 1978), American actress
- Thomas Phoenix, American lawyer and politician
- Tanit Phoenix (born 1980), South African super model and actress
