= Fengcheng =

Fengcheng is the pinyin romanization of various Chinese placenames. It may refer to:

== Cities ==
- Fengcheng, Jiangxi (丰城市), a county-level city in Yichun Prefecture, Jiangxi
- Fengcheng, Liaoning (凤城市), a county-level city in Dandong Prefecture, Liaoning
- Hsinchu (新竹), a city in northern Taiwan nicknamed the "Windy City" (Chinese: 風城; pinyin: Fēngchéng)

== Towns ==
- Fengcheng, Lianjiang County (凤城镇) in Lianjiang County, Fuzhou, Fujian
- Fengcheng, Anxi County (凤城镇) in Anxi County, Fujian
- Fengcheng, Yongding County (凤城镇), in Yongding County, Fujian
- Fengcheng, Guangxi (凤城镇), in Fengshan County, Guangxi
- Fengcheng, Guizhou (凤城镇), in Tianzhu County, Guizhou
- Fengcheng, Jiangsu (凤城镇), in Feng County, Jiangsu
- Fengcheng, Shandong (丰城镇) in Jimo City, Shandong
- Fengcheng, Shanghai (奉城镇) in Fengxian District, Shanghai
- Fengcheng, Yangcheng County (凤城镇), in Yangcheng County, Shanxi
- Fengcheng, Wenshui County (凤城镇), in Wenshui County, Shanxi

== Subdistricts ==
- Daliang Subdistrict, Foshan, formerly Fengcheng, a subdistrict of Shunde, Guangdong

== See also ==
- Phoenix (mythology), Phoenix and Phoenix City being occasional translations of the most common meaning of "Fengcheng" (凤城).
