= The Phoenix (novel) =

2000 historical novel written by Henning Boëtius

- First edition (German)
- Author: Henning Boëtius
- Original title: Phönix aus Asche
- Translator: John Cullen
- Language: German
- Genre: Historical novel
- Publisher: HarperCollins (USA edition)
- Publication date: 2000 (original German edition), 16 July 2001 (USA Hardback Edition)
- Publication place: Germany
- Media type: Print (hardback & paperback)
- Pages: 416 (USA edition)
- ISBN: 0-385-50677-5 (USA Edition)

The Phoenix (German: Phönix aus Asche) (ISBN 0-385-50677-5) is a 2000 historical novel written by German author Henning Boëtius. Its central plot revolves around the 1937 Hindenburg disaster.

Henning Boëtius was the son of Eduard Boëtius, one of the ship's officers, and based his book on accounts his father gave of the disaster.

== Plot summary ==
Fact and fiction are combined to tell the stories of two fictitious people who were involved in the catastrophe; Birger Lund, a Swedish journalist and passenger on the airship, who apparently suffered horrific injuries in a car accident after the crash; and Edmond Boysen, a member of the crew, who was manning the controls at the time, and seems to have got away unscathed.

The book begins some years after the disaster has occurred, as Lund – now with a new identity due to a twist of fate – is searching for Boysen, who he hopes will provide him with some of the answers that might help him to come to terms with what happened, so that he can move on with his life. However, once the story has introduced Lund, it switches focus to Edmond Boysen, and much of the plot then unfolds against the backdrop of Nazi Germany, when the giant Zeppelin airships dominated the skies and their crew members enjoyed an almost celebrity-like lifestyle. Here the author spends a great deal of time describing the technical aspects of the airship, while its final journey and ultimate demise is told in intricate detail.

Birger Lund eventually catches up with Boysen towards the end of the story, and the two have a lengthy discussion as to why the disaster may have happened. They consider a number of theories, including a suggestion that the airship may have been sabotaged. Following this conversation, Lund feels he is able to get some closure and feels he can now start to rebuild his life.

== Reception ==
Publishers Weekly gave The Phoenix a positive review, describing it as a "powerful tale", and concluding that "Boëtius has created an original plot peopled with intensely realized characters, set against a vivid backdrop of prewar politics and the romance of zeppelin flight".
