= Global network positioning =

Coordinates-based mechanism

Global network positioning is a coordinates-based mechanism in a peer-to-peer network architecture which predicts Internet network distance (i.e. round-trip propagation and transmission delay). The mechanism is based on absolute coordinates computed from modeling the Internet as a geometric space. Since end hosts maintain their own coordinates, the approach allows end hosts to compute their inter-host distances as soon as they discover each other. Moreover, coordinates are very efficient in summarizing inter-host distances, making the approach very scalable.

== See also ==
- Vivaldi coordinates
- Pharos Network Coordinates
