= Project Phoenix (South Africa) =

Project Phoenix is a programme established within the South African National Defence Force (SANDF) from 2002 to revive its Reserve Force and bring it on a par with the Regular Force under a "One Force policy." The aim was to allow the reserves to contribute to the full range of military commitments.
