= Lyres of Ur =

Ancient musical instruments found in Iraq

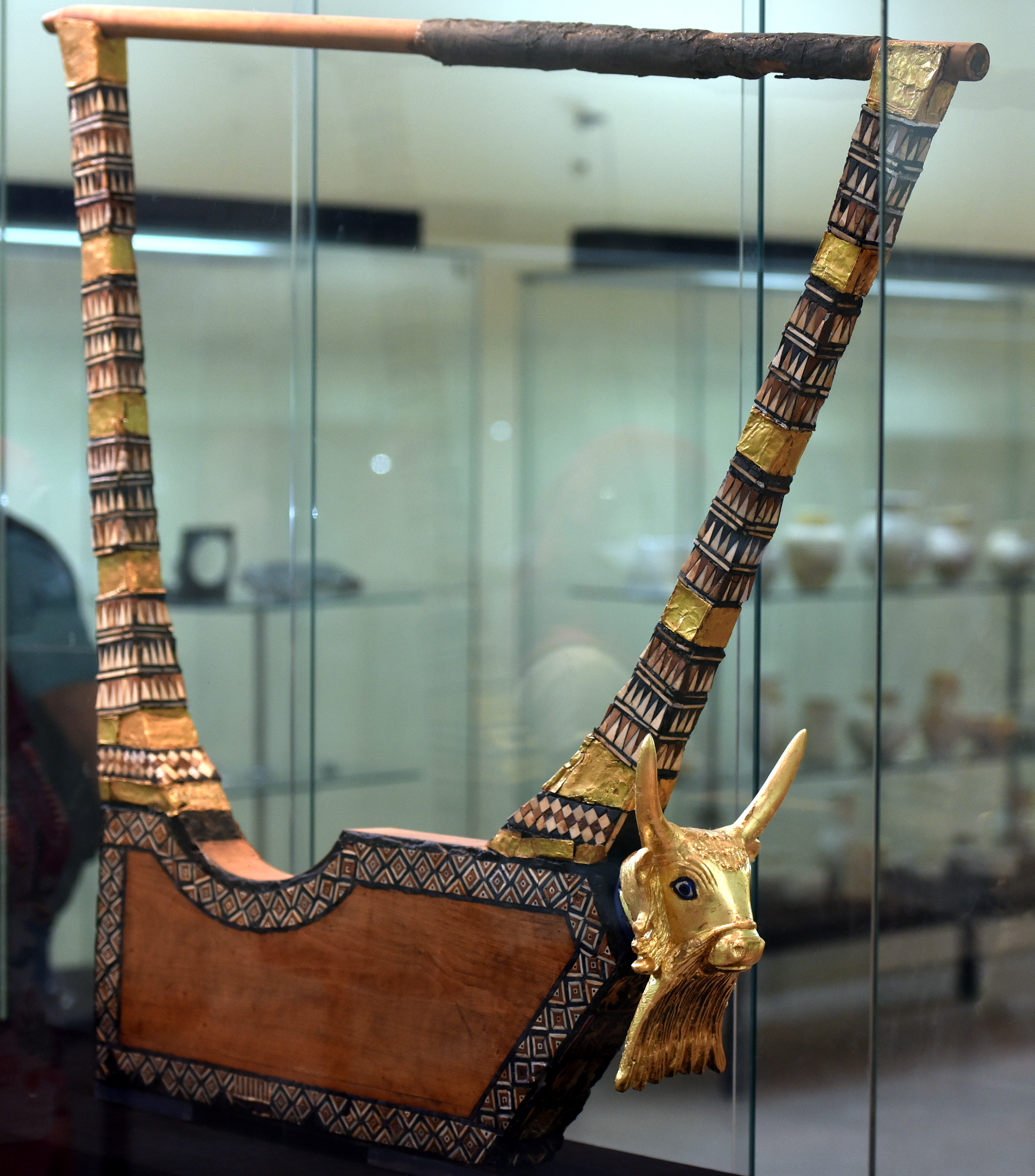
The Golden Lyre of Ur, from the Royal Cemetery at Ur, Iraq Museum, Baghdad

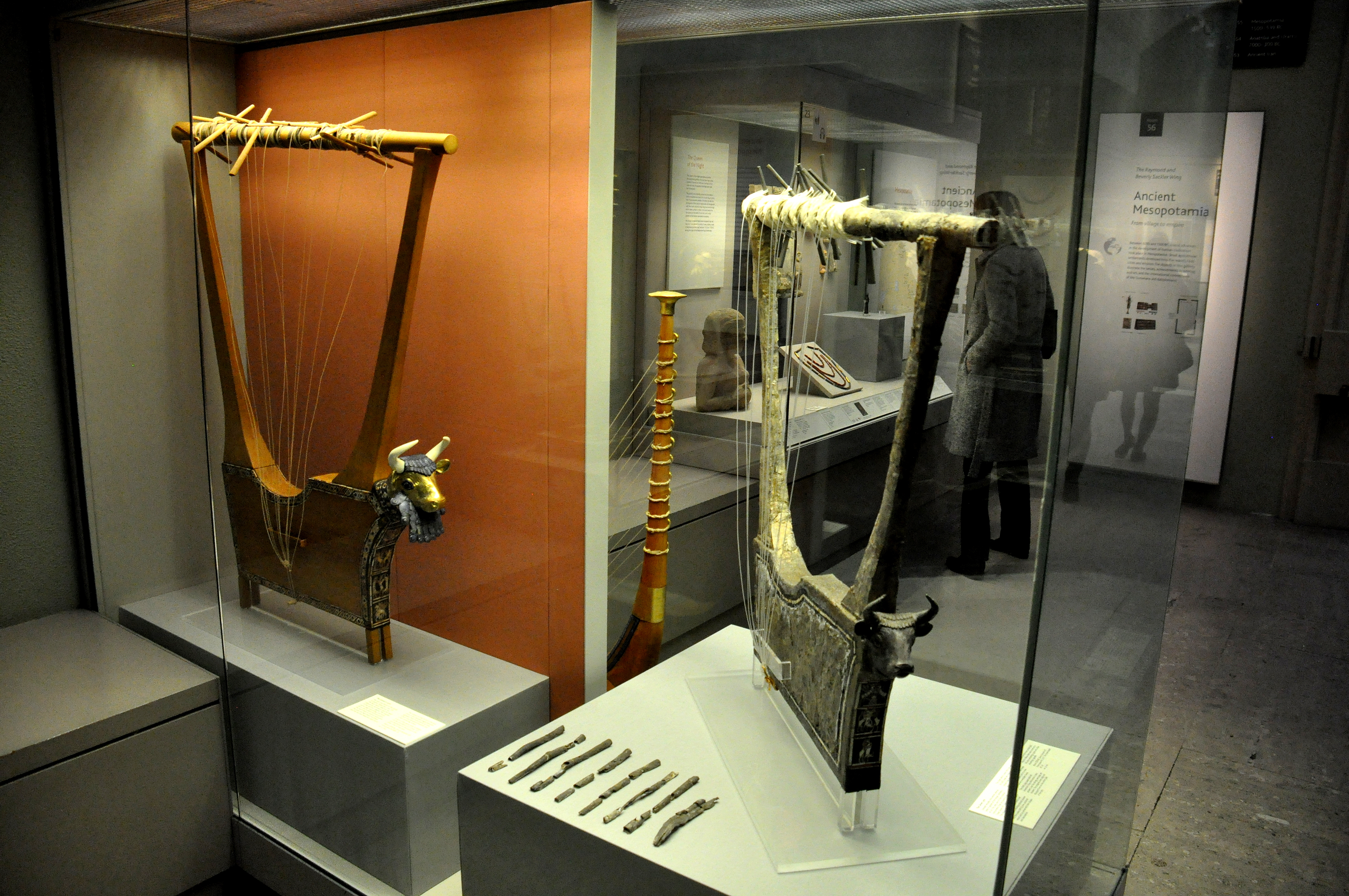
The Queen's Lyre and the Silver Lyre, from the Royal Cemetery at Ur, southern Mesopotamia, Iraq, British Museum, London

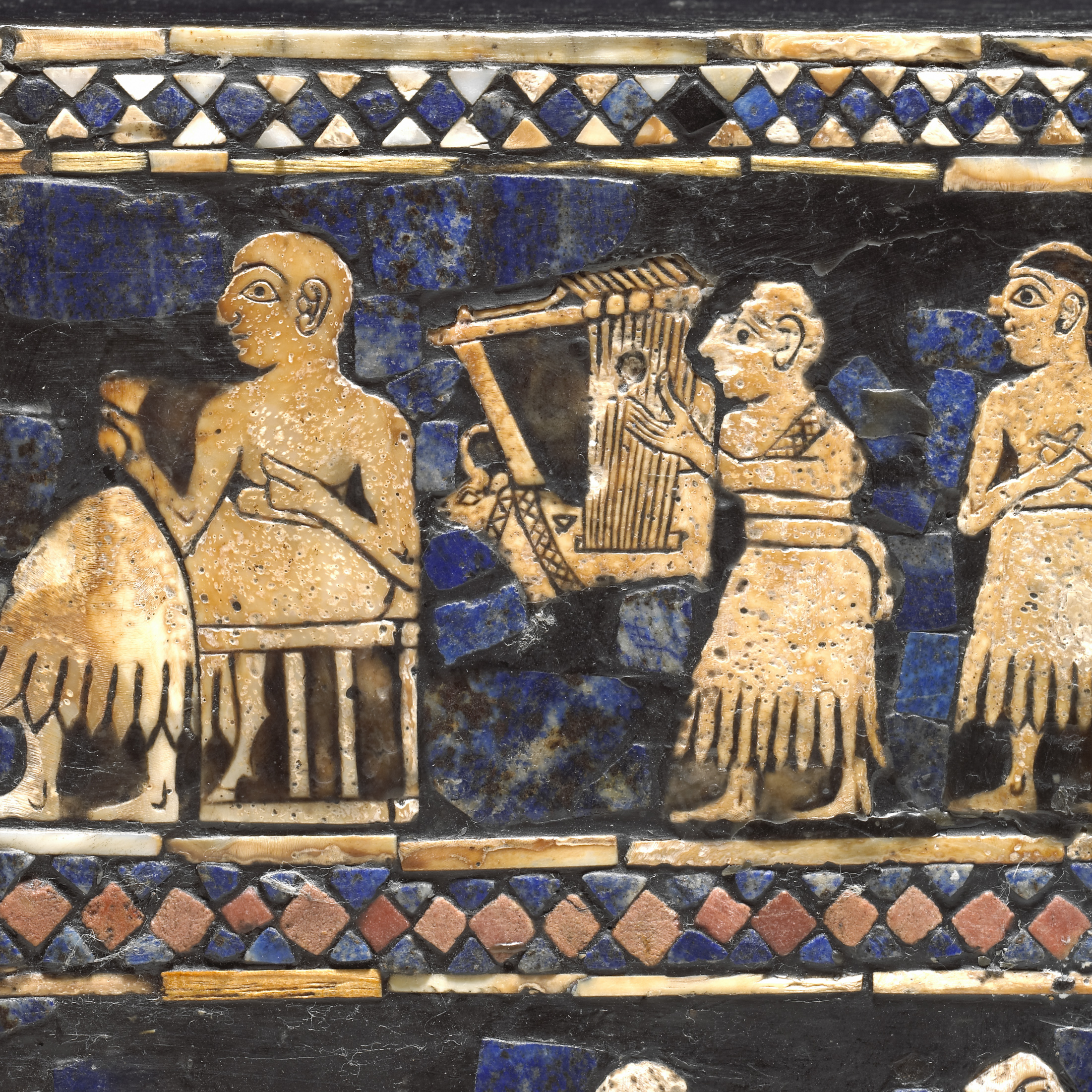
Detail of the "Peace" panel of the Standard of Ur showing lyrist, excavated from the same site as the Lyres of Ur

The Lyres of Ur or Harps of Ur is a group of four string instruments excavated in a fragmentary condition at the Royal Cemetery at Ur in Iraq from 1922 onwards. They date back to the Early Dynastic III Period of Mesopotamia, between about 2550 and 2450 BC, making them the world's oldest surviving stringed instruments. Carefully restored and reconstructed, they are now divided between museums in Iraq, the United Kingdom, and the United States.

Strictly speaking, three lyres and one harp were unearthed, but all are often called lyres. The instrument remains were restored and distributed between the museums that took part in the excavations. The "Golden Lyre of Ur" or "Bull's Lyre", the finest, is in the Iraq Museum in Baghdad. The British Museum in London has the "Queen's Lyre" and "Silver Lyre", and the Penn Museum in Philadelphia has the "Bull-Headed Lyre".

In 1929, archaeologists led by the British archaeologist Leonard Woolley, representing a joint expedition of the British Museum and the University of Pennsylvania Museum of Archaeology and Anthropology, found the instruments while excavating the Royal Cemetery at Ur. They excavated pieces of three lyres and one harp in Ur, located in what was Ancient Mesopotamia and is contemporary Iraq. They are over 4,500 years old, from ancient Mesopotamia during the Early Dynastic III Period (2550–2450 BC). The decorations on the lyres are fine examples of the court art of Mesopotamia of the period.

Leonard Woolley dug up the lyres from amongst the skeletons of ten women in the Royal Cemetery at Ur. One skeleton was even said to be lying against the lyre with her hand placed where the strings would have been. Woolley was quick to pour in a liquid plaster to recover the delicate form of the wooden frame. The wood of the lyres was decayed but since some were covered in nonperishable materials, like gold and silver, they were able to be taken.

== Lyres ==
A lyre is a musical instrument that is stringed and has a role projecting from the body. There are two types of lyres: box and bowl. Like their names suggest, the box lyres have a boxlike body and the bowl lyres have a round body with a curved back. The Lyres of Ur are box lyres. They were played in an upright position with the strings plucked with both hands.

Because of their positioning in situ it is believed that the lyres were used in burial ceremonies in accompaniment to songs. Each lyre has 11 strings to play on that would produce a buzzing noise that is repeated throughout the song. The musician playing the instrument would repeat the pattern displayed on the lyre.

== The four lyres ==
The "Golden Lyre of Ur" or "Bull's Lyre" is the finest lyre, and was given to the Iraq Museum in Baghdad. Its reconstructed wooden body was damaged due to flooding during the Second Iraqi War; a replica of it is being played as part of a touring ensemble. The "Golden Lyre" got its name because the whole head of the bull is made of gold. The eyes are made of inlaid nacre and lapis lazuli. The beard is similar in appearance to the "Great Lyre" and the "Queen's Lyre". The body of the bull was originally wood but did not survive. Its discoverer, Woolley, believed that, unlike the other lyres, the body of the "Golden Lyre" would have originally had legs.

The "Queen's Lyre" is one of two that Woolley removed from the grave of Queen Pu-abi. The "Queen's Lyre" is 110 centimetres (44 in) in height and is similar in appearance to that of the "Great Lyre". The mask of the bull is gold. The eyes, hair, and beard are all made of lapis lazuli and the horns are modern. The shape of the lyre is meant to resemble a bull's body. A noticeable difference between the "Great Lyre" and the "Queen's Lyre" is that the "Great Lyre" has a straight forehead whereas the "Queen's Lyre" curves slightly around the brow bone. It is held in the British Museum.

The "Bull Headed Lyre" is 40 cm (16 in) in height, 11 cm (4.3 in) in width, and 19 cm (7.5 in) in depth. The shape of the lyre is meant to resemble a bull's body. Its head, face and horns are all wrapped in gold foil while its hair, beard, and eyes are made of lapis lazuli. Below the head is a front panel made of shell inlay set into bitumen. This panel depicts a figure holding onto a bull's horns above, and animals acting as humans below. The bull head itself likely represents the sun god Utu, who was thought to be able to descend into the underworld. The lyre is held in the Penn Museum in Philadelphia.

The "Silver Lyre" is 110 cm (42 in) in height and 97 cm (38 in) in width. It is one of two silver lyres taken from the "Great Death Pit". Both lyres were made of wood and then covered in sheets of silver that were attached with small silver nails. The eyes are made of lapis lazuli and the lyre was also trimmed with narrow borders of lapis lazuli. This is the only lyre that is not bearded. Because of this fresh face some believe it is actually a cow rather than a bull. It is held by the British Museum.

The Penn Museum also holds a silver boat-shaped Lyre.

== Gallery ==
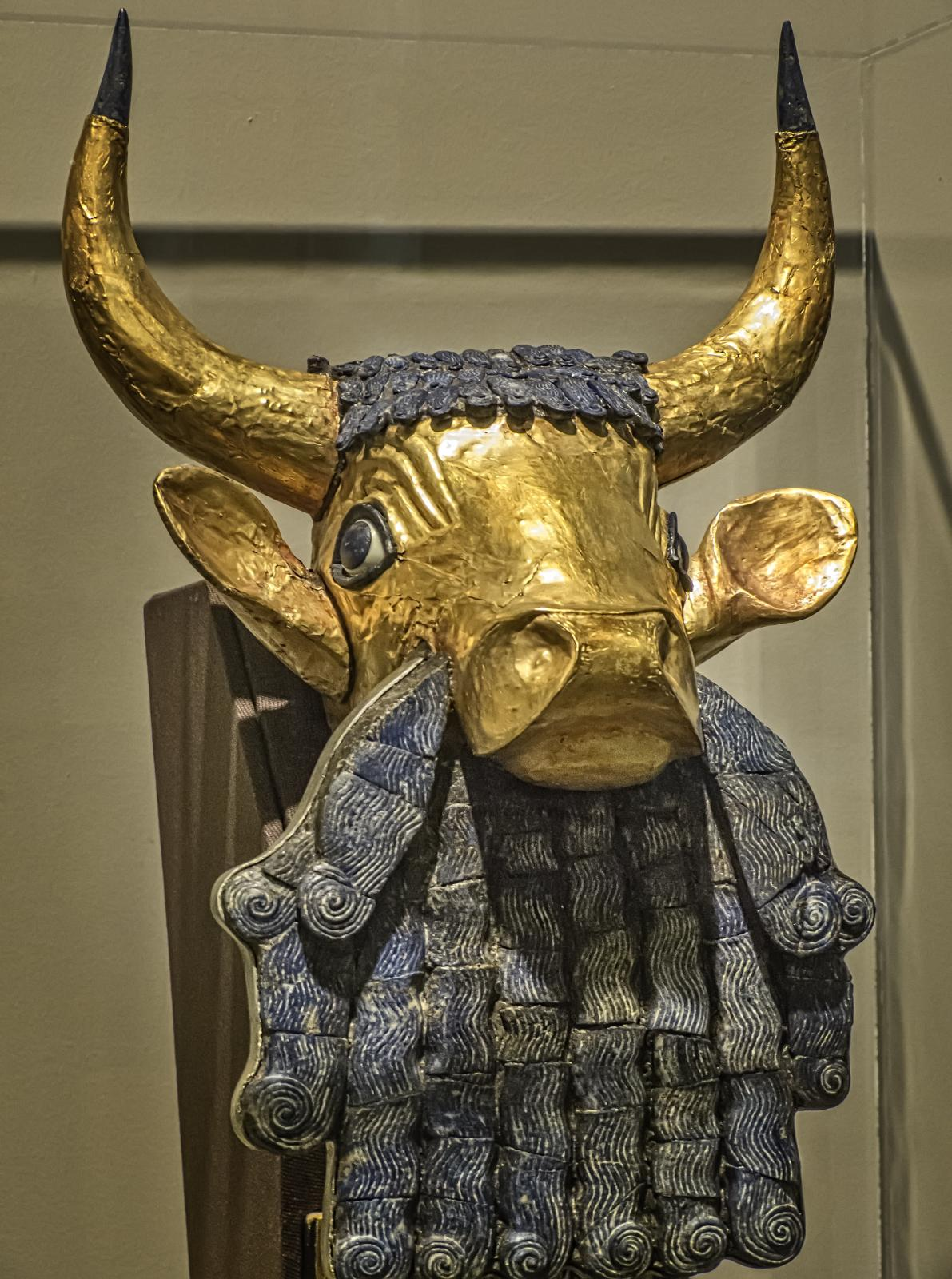
Head of the "Bull Headed Lyre"

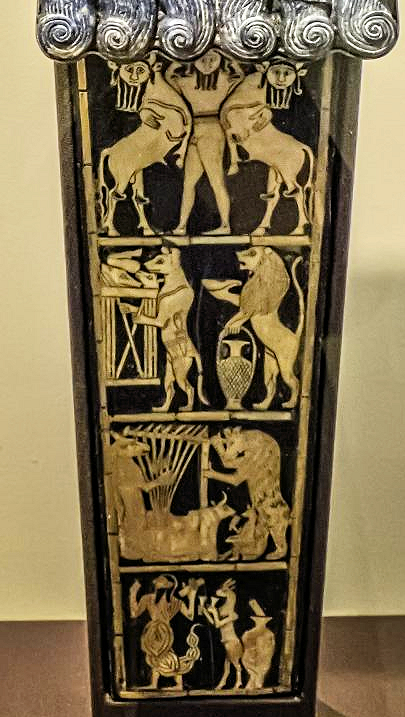
Plaque from the "Bull Headed Lyre"

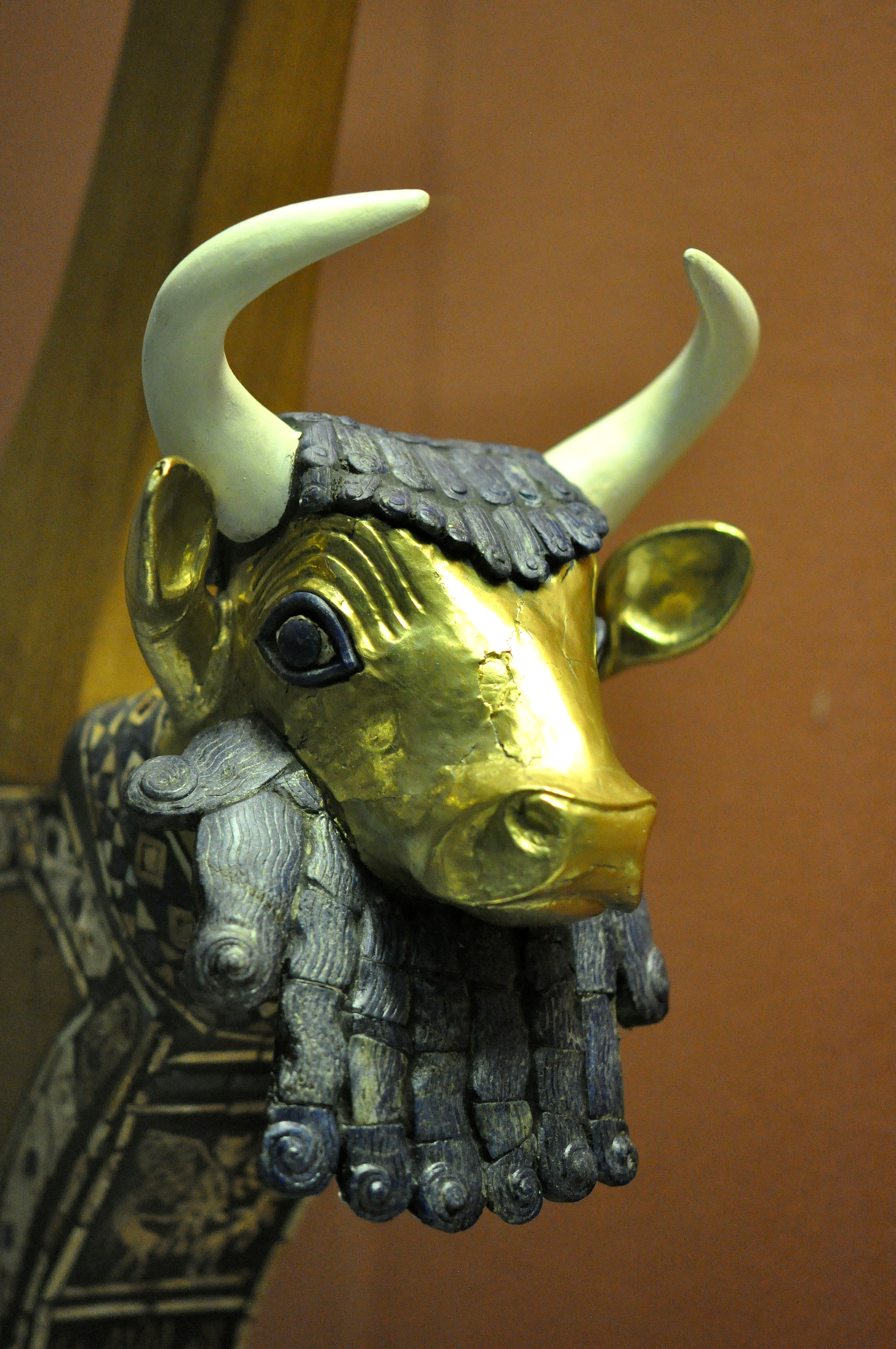
Bull's head of the Queen's lyre from Pu-abi's grave PG 800, the Royal Cemetery at Ur, Southern Mesopotamia, Iraq. British Museum

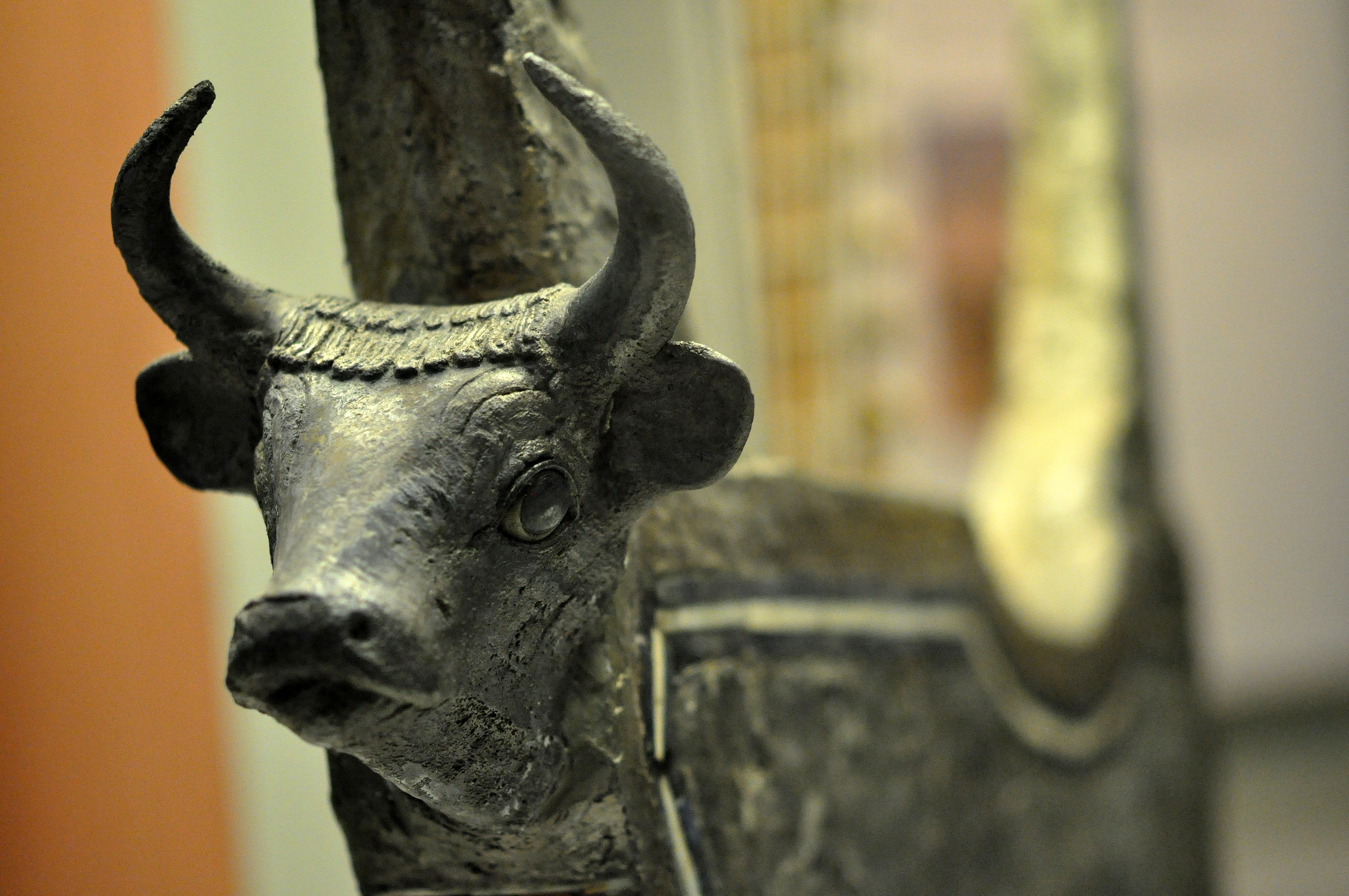
Cow's head of the Silver Lyre, from the Great Death Pit at the Royal Cemetery, Ur, southern Mesopotamia, Iraq. The British Museum, London

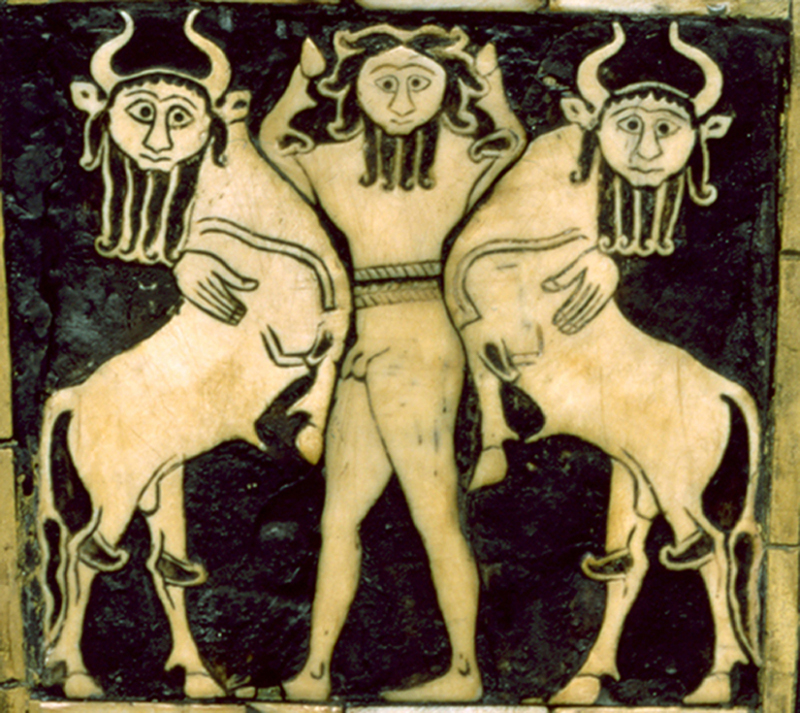
Master of animals motif in a panel of the soundboard of the "Bull Headed Lyre"

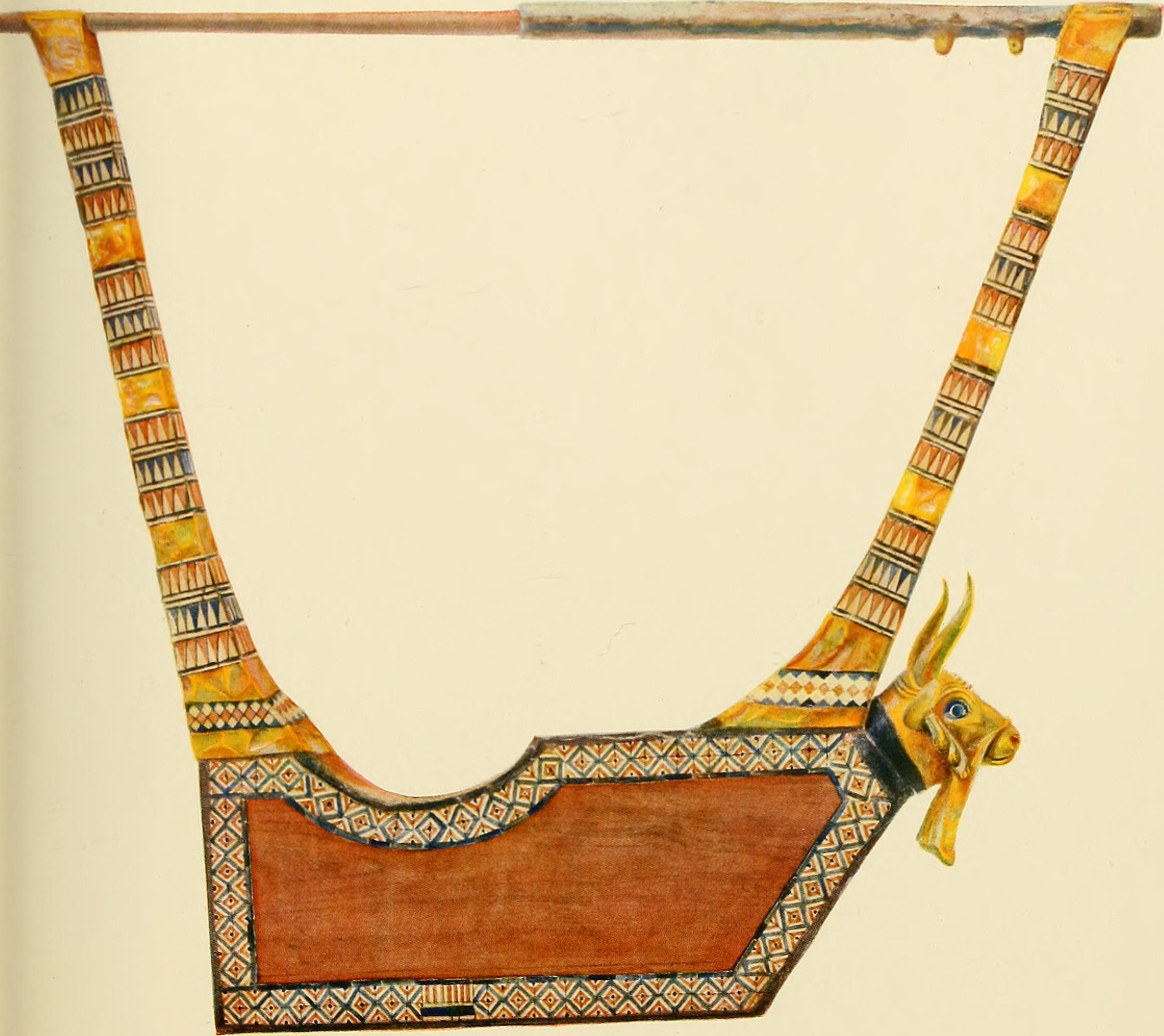
The Golden Lyre from Woolley's published record

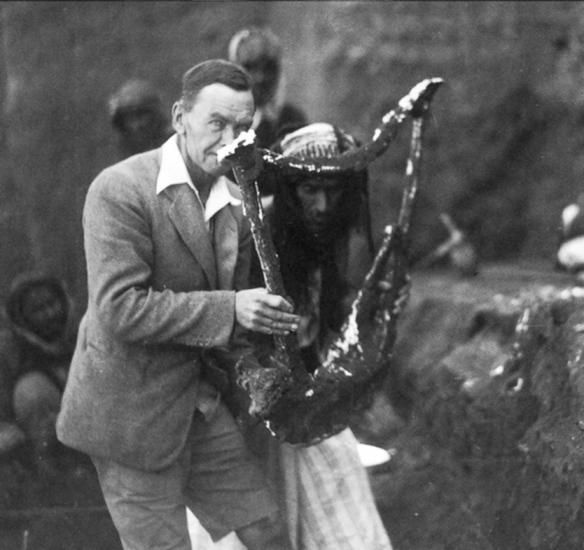
Leonard Woolley holding the hardened plaster mold of the Sumerian Queen's Lyre, 1922

== See also ==
- Music of Mesopotamia
- Ninigizibara
- 1929 in archaeology
- Kinnor, ancient Hebrew form of a lyre or kithara
- Nevel, ancient Hebrew form of a harp or nabla
