= Bull Headed Lyre of Ur =

One of the oldest stringed instruments ever discovered

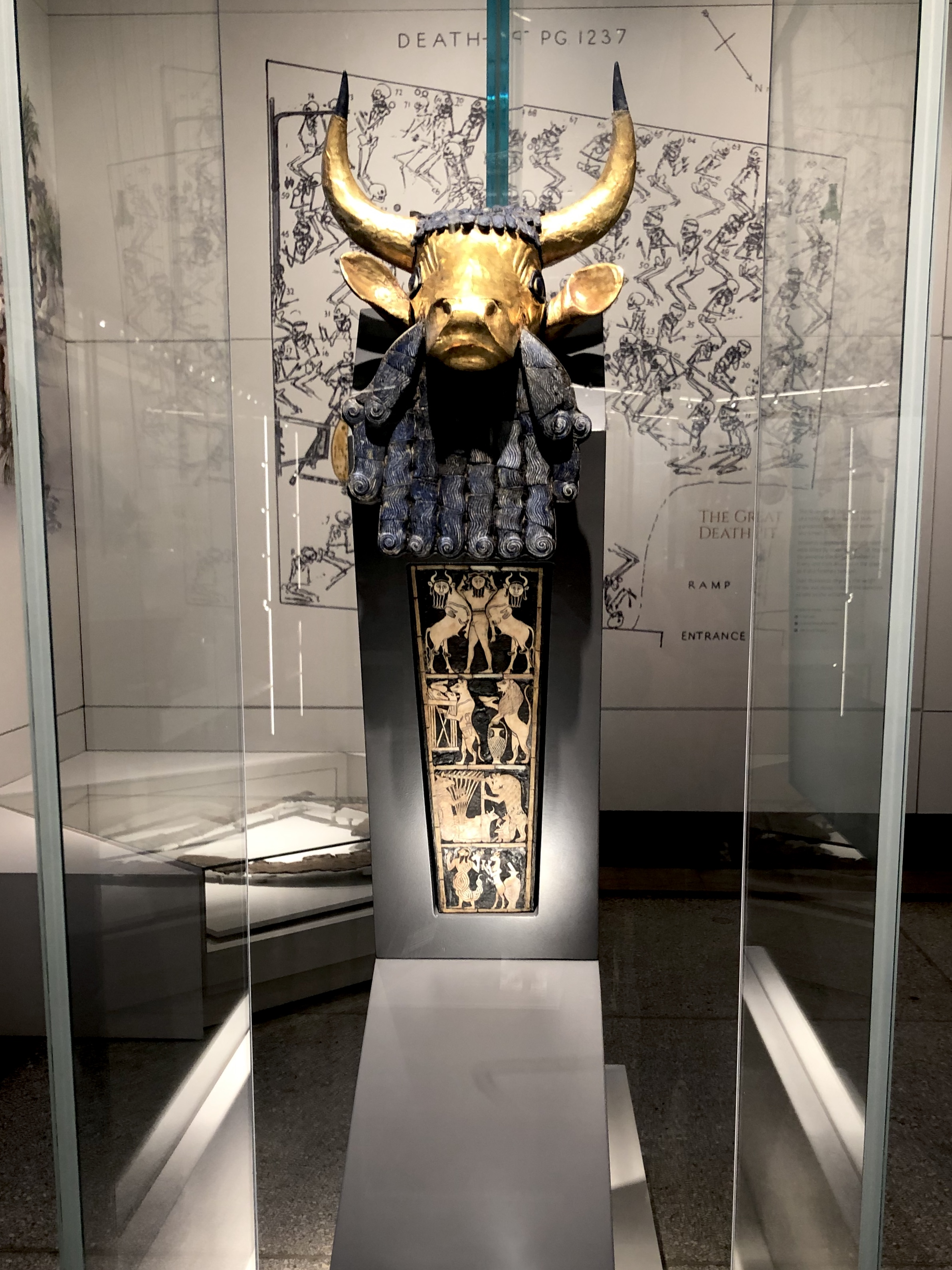
- Bull Headed Lyre of Ur as displayed in the Penn Museum
- Material: Gold, silver, copper, bitumen, shell, and lapis lazuli
- Size: Head dimensions: 40 cm long, 25 cm wide, 19 cm deep
- Created: 2550–2450 BCE
- Present location: Penn Museum, Philadelphia
- Identification: Penn Museum Object Number B17694B

The Bull Headed Lyre is one of the oldest string instruments ever discovered. The lyre was excavated in the Royal Cemetery at Ur during the 1926–1927 season of an archeological dig carried out in what is now Iraq jointly by the University of Pennsylvania and the British Museum. Leonard Woolley led the excavations.

The lyre was found in "The King's Grave", near the bodies of more than sixty soldiers and attendants. It is one of several lyres and harps unearthed at the cemetery which date to the Early Dynastic III Period (2550–2450 BCE). The lyre was included in the first batch of materials taken to the University of Pennsylvania Museum of Archaeology and Anthropology (the Penn Museum) in 1929. The piece consists of a sound box, a quadripartite panel and a sculpted bull's head. Over the years it has undergone extensive conservation and restoration work.

== Composition ==
The Mesopotamian sun god Utu/Shamash was often taken to assume the form of a bull, particularly in his role at sunrise, and is the figure most frequently described in some cuneiform texts as having a lapis lazuli beard. For these reasons, the Penn Museum has asserted that the bull head of the lyre is a representation of Utu/Shamash. The head was made of a single piece of gold plating over a wooden core (now disintegrated) with gold plated ears and horns attached with small pegs. The beard is made of carved lapis lazuli tesserae on a silver backing. The tips of the bull's horns are also lapis lazuli, making this the only animal-shaped lyre at Ur to have horns tipped in a separate material. The eyes of the bull are shell and lapis lazuli strung with copper wire. In its dimensions, the bull's head is 40 cm (16 in) long, 25 cm (9.8 in) wide, and 19 cm (7.5 in) deep.

The lyre has a front panel which depicts four scenes linked to Early Mesopotamian funerary rituals. The designs are made of shell inlay on bitumen. The first panel shows a man wrestling two bulls with human heads. The second shows a hyena serving meat and a lion bearing a jar. The third shows an equine animal playing a bull shaped lyre, while a bear supports the lyre, and another animal holds a rattle. The lowest register shows a scorpion man who guards the underworld, greeting a man. In addition to his role as sun god, Utu / Shamash was the judge of the dead. In the lyre, he can be seen as presiding over the events represented in the panel affixed below his head.

The lyre's wooden sound box had disintegrated by the time of its excavation, however Woolley's measurements of the box's imprint, as well as casts made from another lyre in the cemetery, have provided the basis for attempts at recreation.

== Restoration ==
The plating of the bull's head had collapsed and torn once the wooden core had deteriorated. The bitumen of the front panel had been pulverized, dislodging the shell inlay. Both were originally restored at the British Museum. When they arrived at the Penn Museum a new sound box was created, and painted by watercolorist M. L. Baker. Its excavator, L. Woolley, visited the museum in 1955, and remarked that the reproduction soundbox seemed too large. Measurements of the lyre's imprint taken during the excavation later verified this observation.

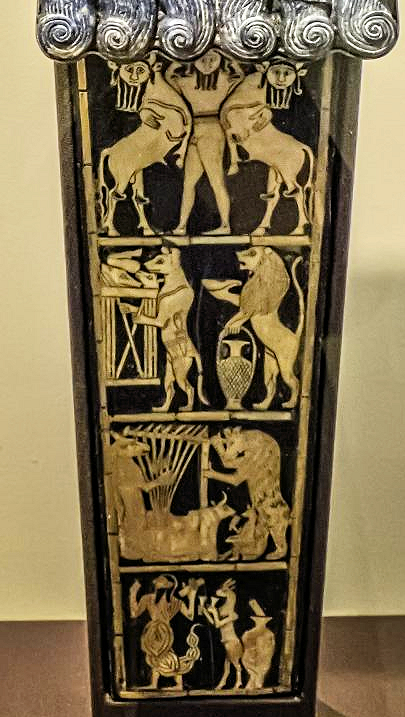
Detail of one of the lyre's ornamental plaques: Master of animals motif in the 1st panel, the lyre is itself shown in the 3rd panel down, with a bear steadying it as it is played.

The museum created a new sound box drawing from these measurements in 1976. The restoration was intended only to recreate the outward appearance of the original lyre; the restoration was not intended to recreate a playable instrument, nor to approximate the sound quality of the original. A different, functioning replica of it is being played as part of a touring ensemble.

That same year, plans to clean and enhance the appearance of the head and plaque led to the discovery of extensive deterioration. In 1977, work began to restore the bull head and the plaque. The head was dismantled and reassembled to expose more of the original work, straighten the ears, and preserve the integrity of the construction.

Additional fragments from the field which had been mistakenly omitted from the lyre's parts-list were re-incorporated into the design, and plaster from the first restoration was removed. Following some experimentation a type of polyethylene glycol wax found to fill the head, which preserves its strength and is removable. These processes, along with X-rays, have uncovered new information about the head's construction.

After the sound box's second reconstruction, the lyre's size increased by about a third, suggesting that the lyre must have been steadied by a second person in order for it to be played. This matches the second image of the adjoining plaque which shows two creatures playing in this manner.

== See also ==
- Lyres of Ur
- Ninigizibara
- Music of Mesopotamia
