= Master of Animals =

Motif in ancient art showing a human between and grasping two confronted animals

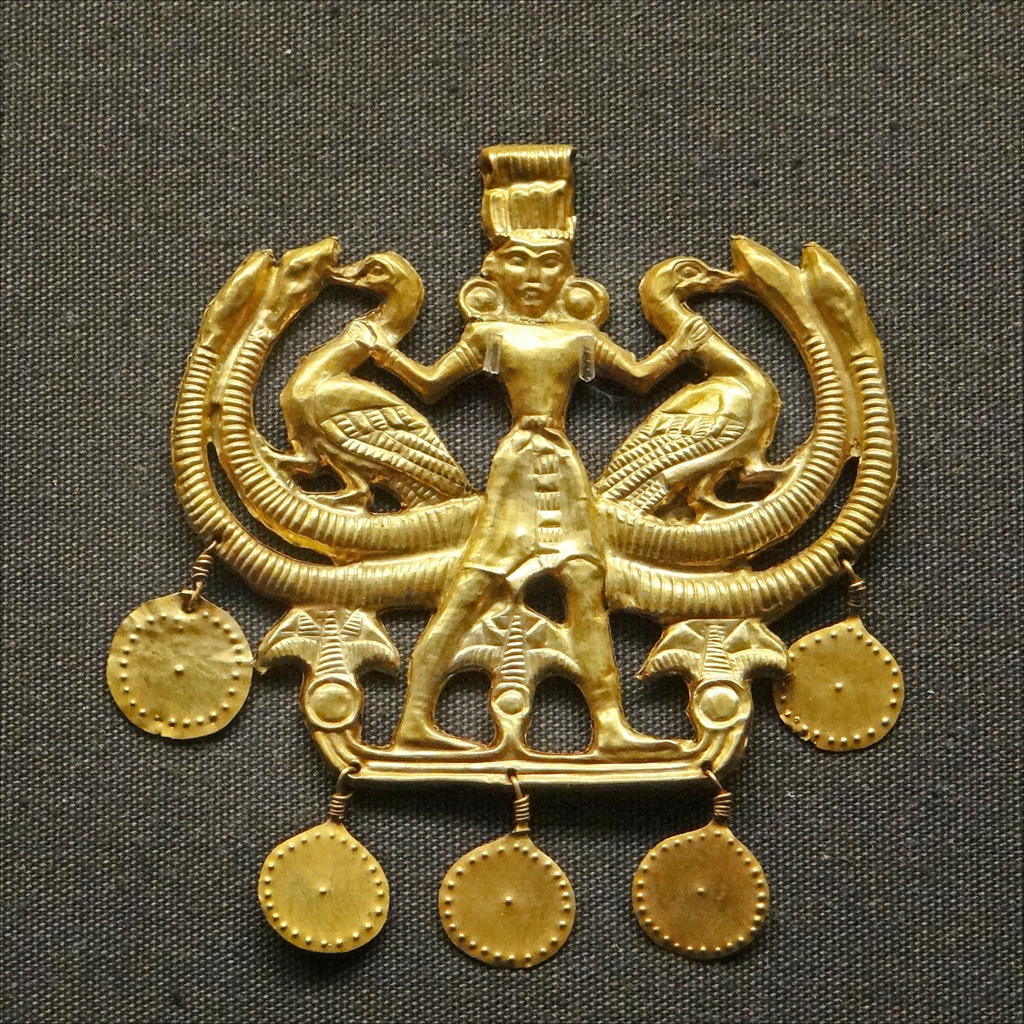
Egyptianizing gold pendant showing the Lord of the Animals, Minoan, 1700–1500 BC. Aegina Treasure. (British Museum)

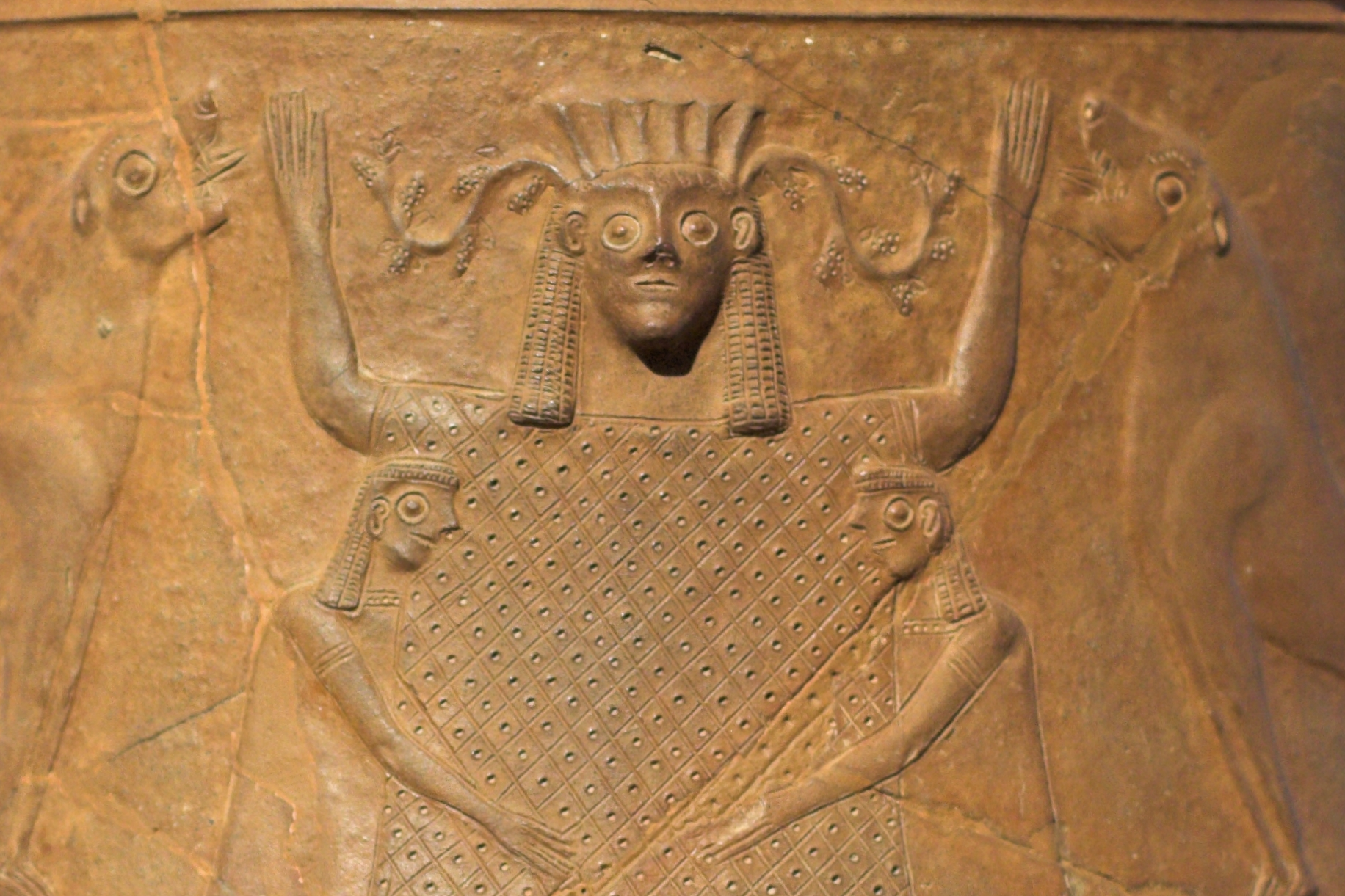
Mistress of animals (Potnia Theron) Pithos with relief, 625-600 BC, National Archaeological Museum of Athens

The Master of Animals, Lord of Animals, or Mistress of the Animals is a motif in ancient art showing a human between and grasping two confronted animals. The motif is very widespread in the art of Mesopotamia. The figure may be female or male, it may be a column or a symbol, the animals may be realistic or fantastical, and the human figure may have animal elements such as horns, an animal upper body, an animal lower body, legs, or cloven feet. What the motif represented to the cultures that created the works probably varies greatly; however, when the figure is male, interpreters typically describe it as a hero, unless it is shown with specific divine attributes.

The motif is so widespread and visually effective that many depictions probably were conceived as decoration with only a vague meaning attached to them. The Master of Animals is the "favorite motif of Achaemenian official seals", but the figures in these cases should be understood as the king.

The human figure may be standing, as found from the fourth millennium BC, or as kneeling on one knee found from the third millennium BC. They are usually shown looking frontally, but in Assyrian pieces typically they are shown from the side. Sometimes the animals are clearly alive, whether fairly passive and tamed, or still struggling, rampant, or attacking. In other pieces they may represent dead hunter's prey.

Other associated representations show a figure controlling or "taming" a single animal, usually to the right of the figure. But the many representations of heroes or kings killing an animal are distinguished from these.

== Art ==
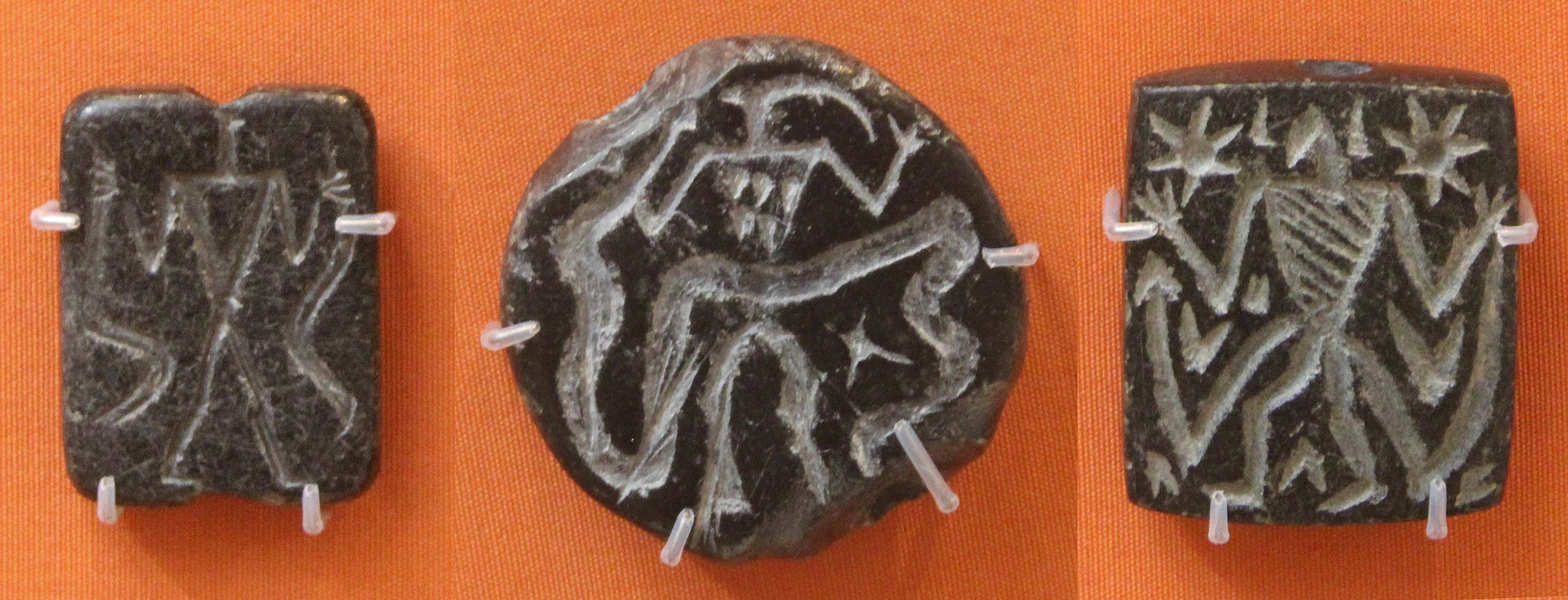
"Master of the Animals" stamp seals, Tepe Giyan, Iran, 5000-4000 BC.

The earliest known depiction of such a motif may be the Seated Woman of Çatalhöyük (c. 6000 BC).

More examples appear on stamp seals of the Ubaid period in Mesopotamia. The motif appears on a terracotta stamp seal from Tell Telloh, ancient Girsu, at the end of the prehistoric Ubaid period of Mesopotamia, c. 4000 BC.

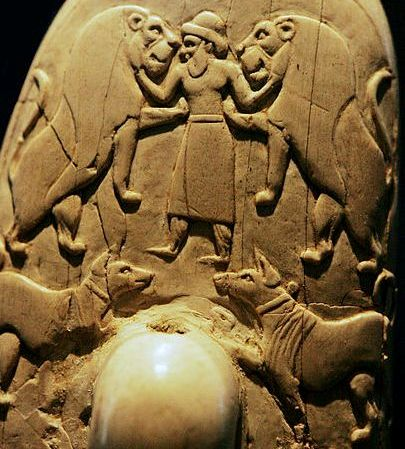
Gebel el-Arak Knife (c. 3450 BC). Naqada II, Egypt

A Master of Animals motif also appears in the oldest known Egyptian painted tomb mural, a depiction of men, boats and animals located in Tomb 100 at Hierakonpolis and dating to the Predynastic period (c. 3500-3200 BC). The motif also was given the topmost location of the famous Gebel el-Arak Knife in the Louvre, an ivory and flint knife dating from the Naqada II d period of Egyptian prehistory, which began c. 3450 BC. Here a figure in Mesopotamian dress, often interpreted to be a god, grapples with two lions. It has been connected to the famous Pashupati seal from the Indus Valley civilization (2500-1500 BC), showing a figure seated in a yoga-like posture, with a horned headress (or horns), and surrounded by animals. Of great historical importance, given its centrality to the development of Classical Greek architectural sculpture, is the West pediment of the Temple of Artemis at Corfu, dating to c. 600-580 B.C. Sculpted in the early Archaic style, the central portion of the pediment depicts a Gorgon closely flanked by two lions in a heraldic pose. The sculptor may have drawn inspiration from the famous Lion Gate at Mycenae (c. 1250 BC) (also a heraldic two-lion arrangement), with Near Eastern antecedents such as the Lion Gate at Hattusa (capital of the late Bronze Age Hittite Empire) in modern-day Turkey.

Later notable examples include the Gundestrup cauldron, which contains a depiction of a man with antlers, seated with legs part-crossed, surrounded by animals while grasping a snake in one hand and a torc in the other. This famous and puzzling object probably dates to 200 BC, or possibly as late as 300 AD, and although found in Denmark, it may have been made in Thrace.

A form of the motif appears on a belt buckle of the Early Middle Ages from Kanton Wallis, Switzerland, which depicts the biblical figure of Daniel between two lions.

The purse-lid from the Sutton Hoo burial of about 620 AD has two plaques with a human between two wolves, and the motif is common in Anglo-Saxon art and related Early Medieval styles, where the animals generally remain aggressive. Other notable examples of the motif in Germanic art include one of the Torslunda plates, and helmets from Vendel and Valsgärde.

A variant is also found in the Kingdom of Benin amongst the Benin Bronzes, where the Oba (king) is seen holding two leopards by the tail in each arm.

In the art of Mesopotamia the motif appears very early, usually with a "naked hero", for example at Uruk in the Uruk period (c. 4000 to 3100 BC), but was "outmoded in Mesopotamia by the seventh century BC". In Luristan bronzes the motif is extremely common, and often highly stylized. In terms of its composition this motif compares with another very common motif in the art of the ancient Near East and Mediterranean, that of two confronted animals flanking and grazing on a Tree of Life, interpreted as representing an earth deity.

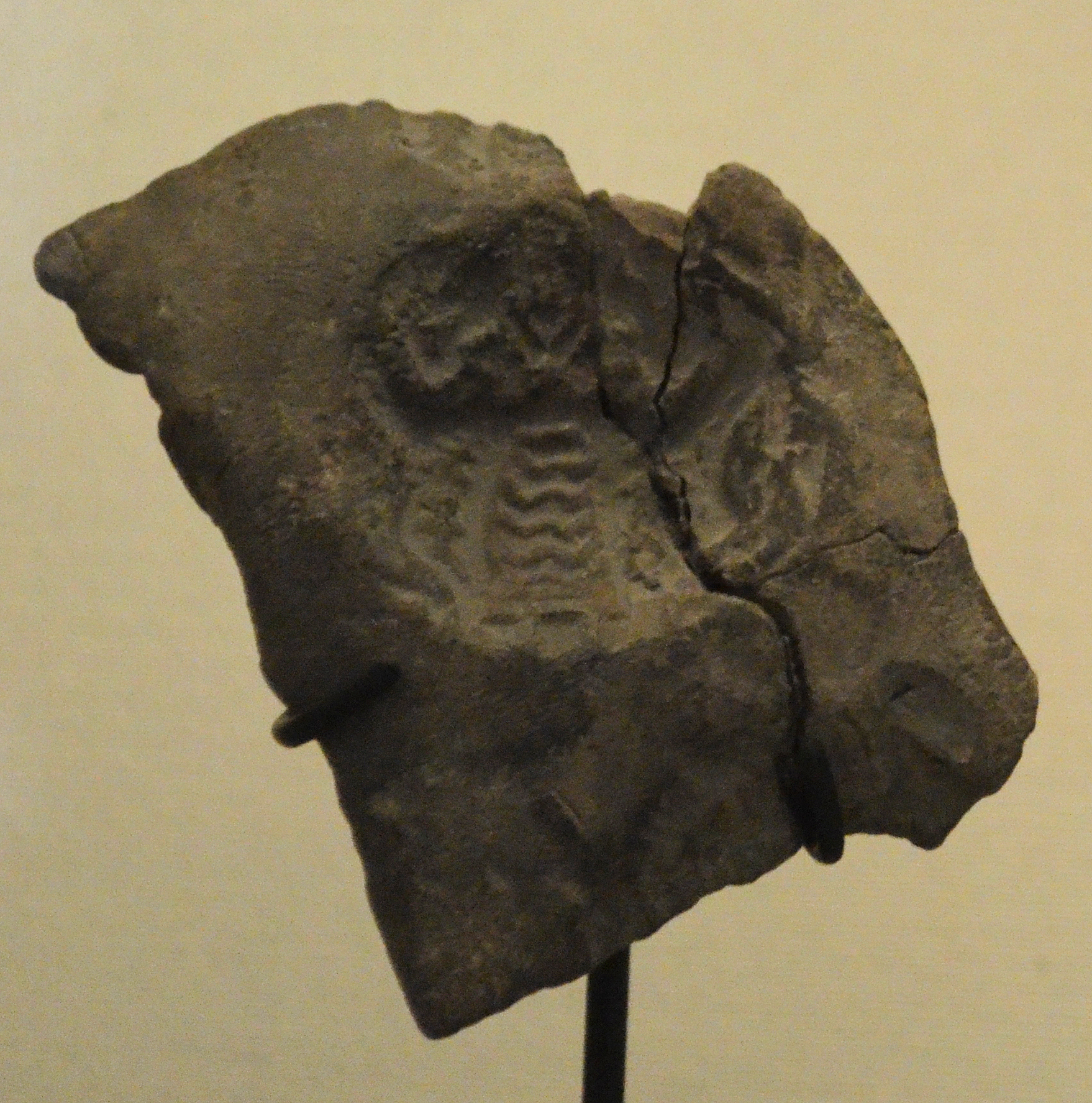
Master of animals, Susa I (4200-3800 BC), Louvre Museum

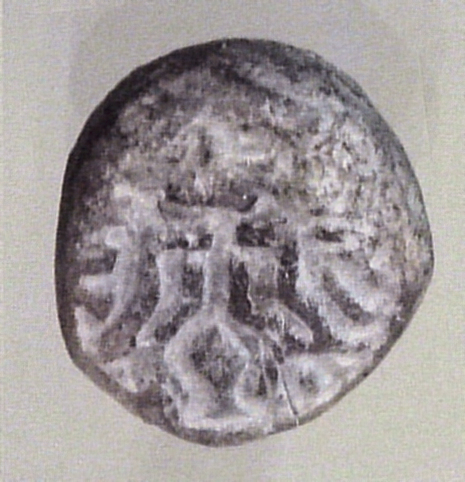
Terracotta stamp seal with Master of Animals motif, Tell Telloh, ancient Girsu, End of Ubaid period, c. 4000 BC

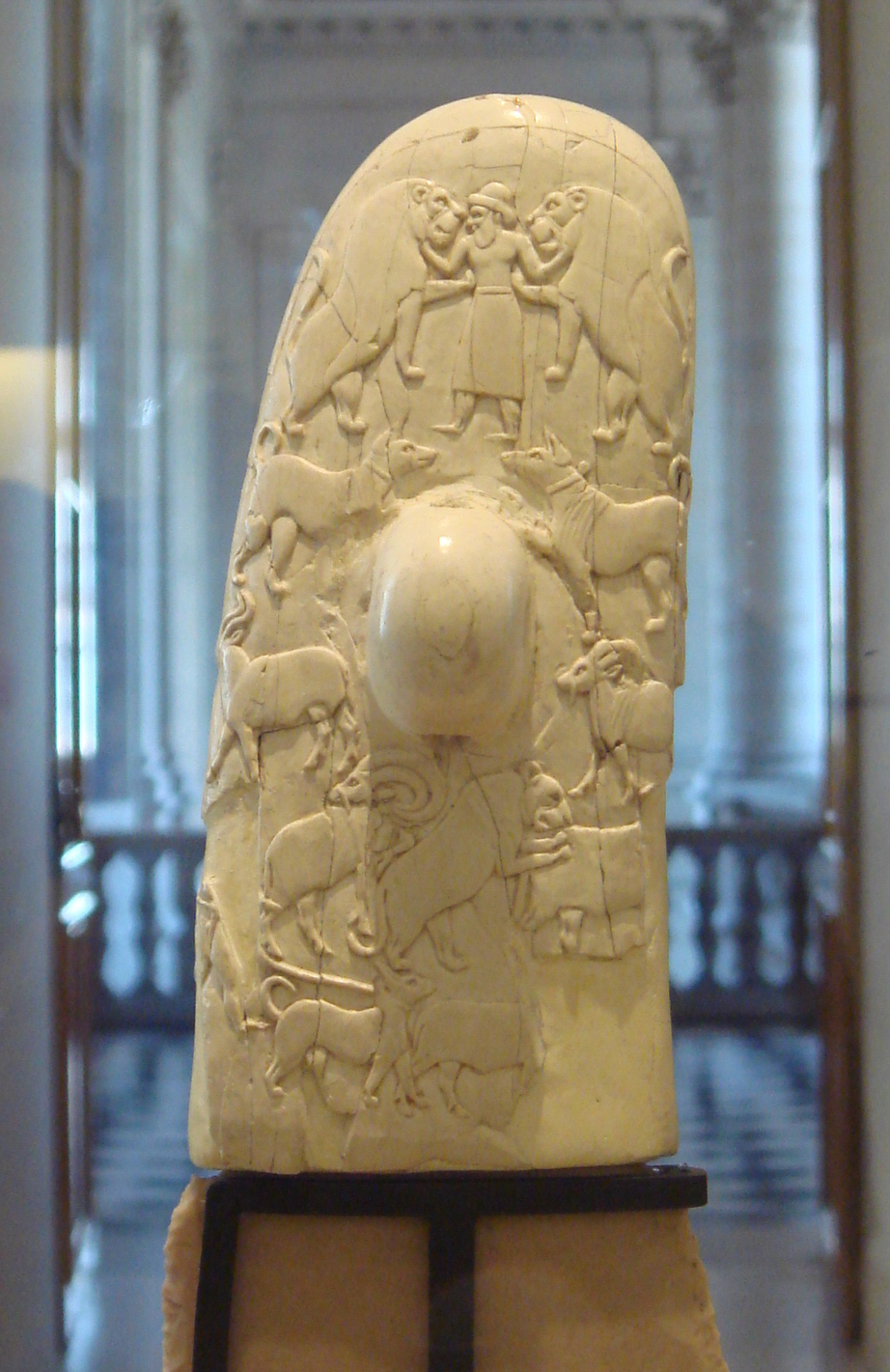
Gebel el-Arak Knife ivory handle (front), after c. 3450 BC

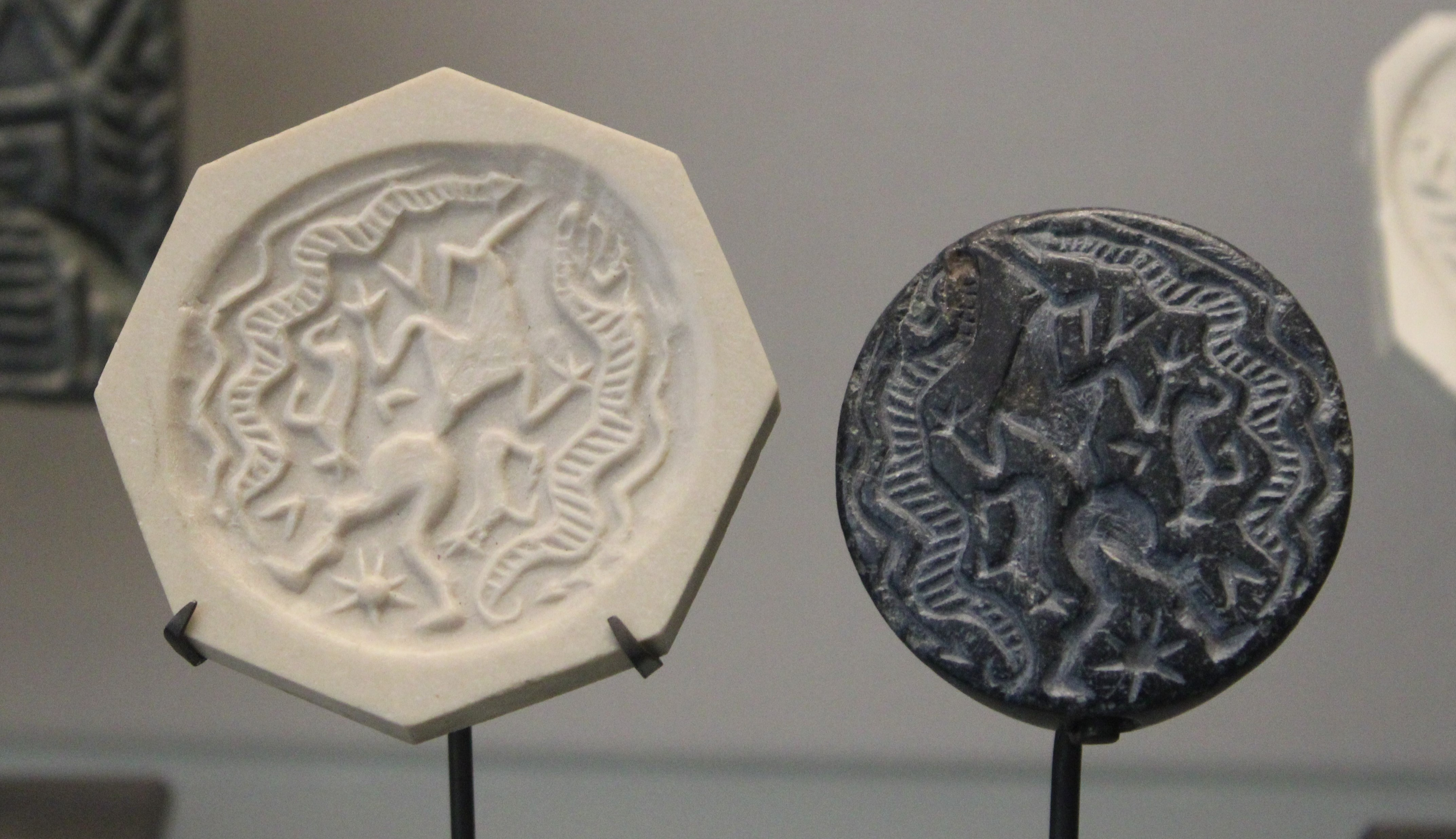
Soapstone stamp with, depicting an ibex-headed character taming snakes. Lorestan, 4th millennium BC, Louvre Museum

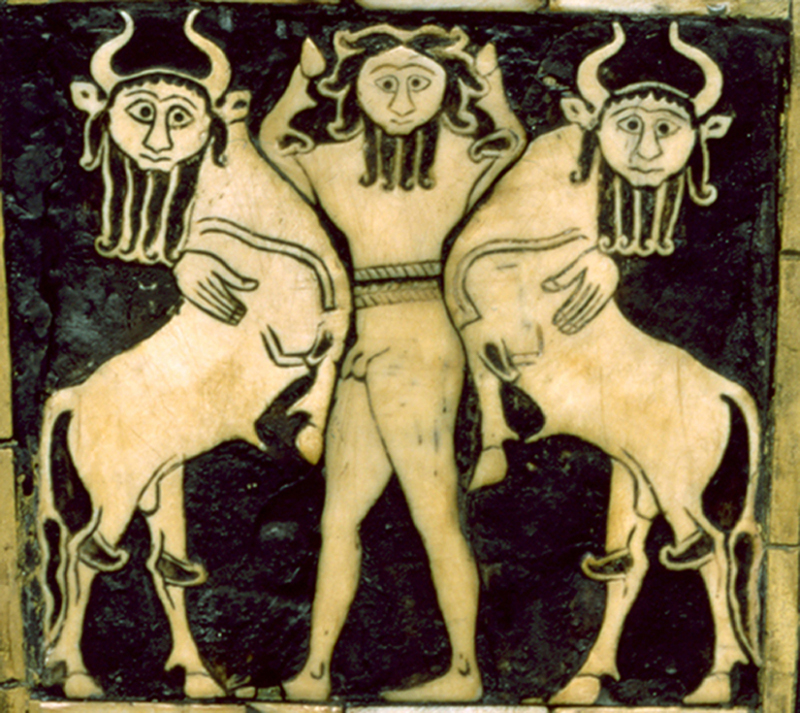
Protective Master from the Bull Headed Lyre of Ur, dated circa 2600 BC, Penn Museum

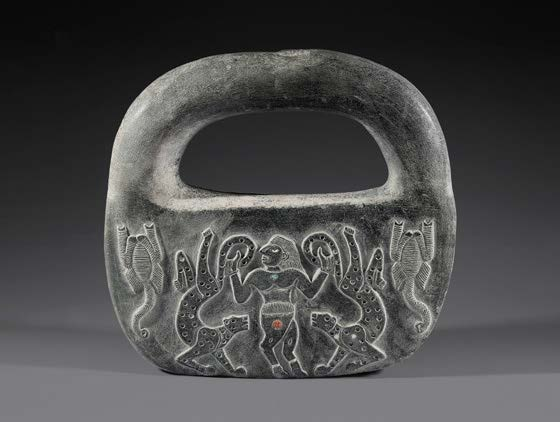
Chlorite, Jiroft culture Iran, ca. 2500 BC, Bronze Age I a cloven-footed human flanked by scorpions and leopards

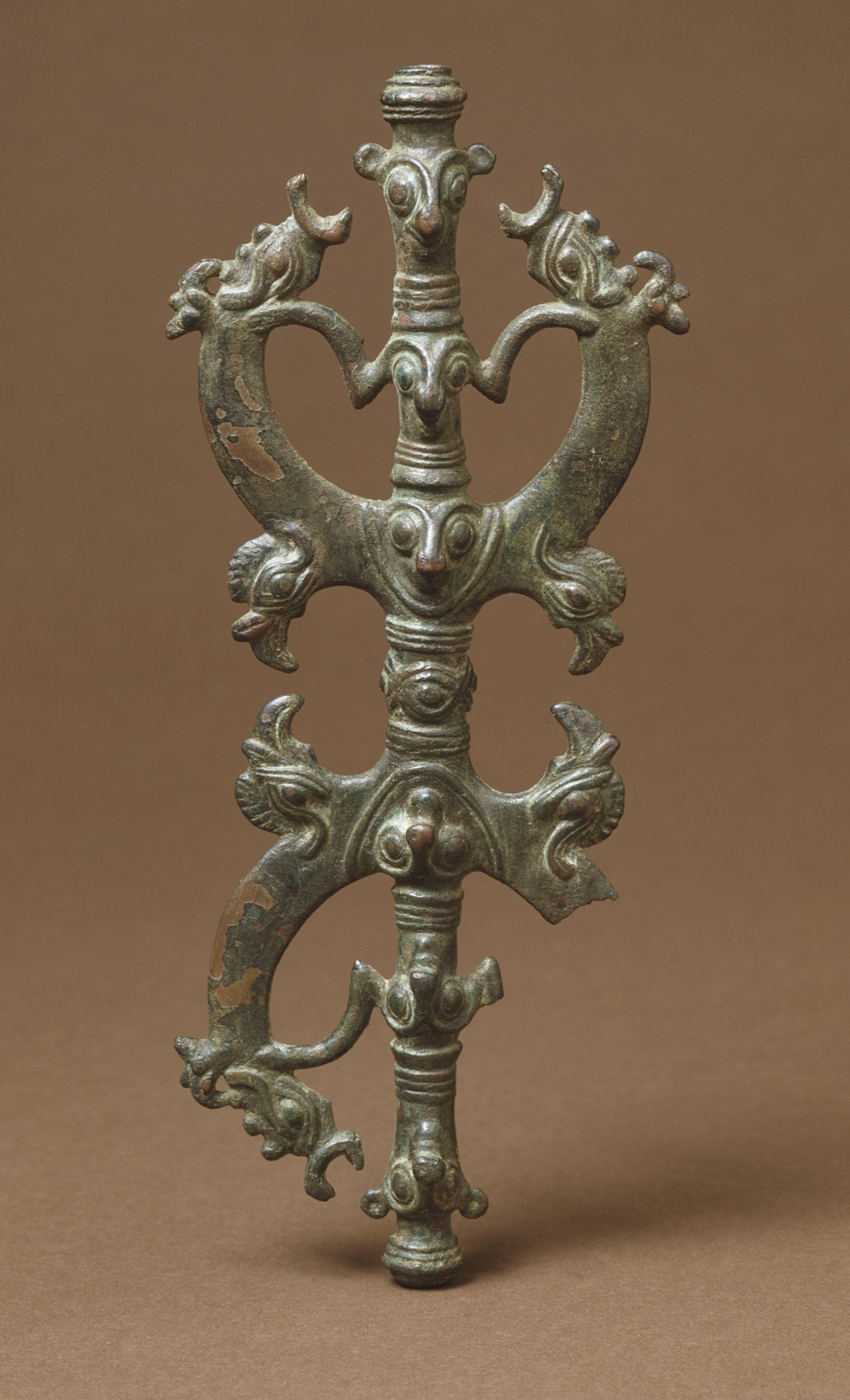
Luristan bronze finial in the form of the 'Master of Animals'

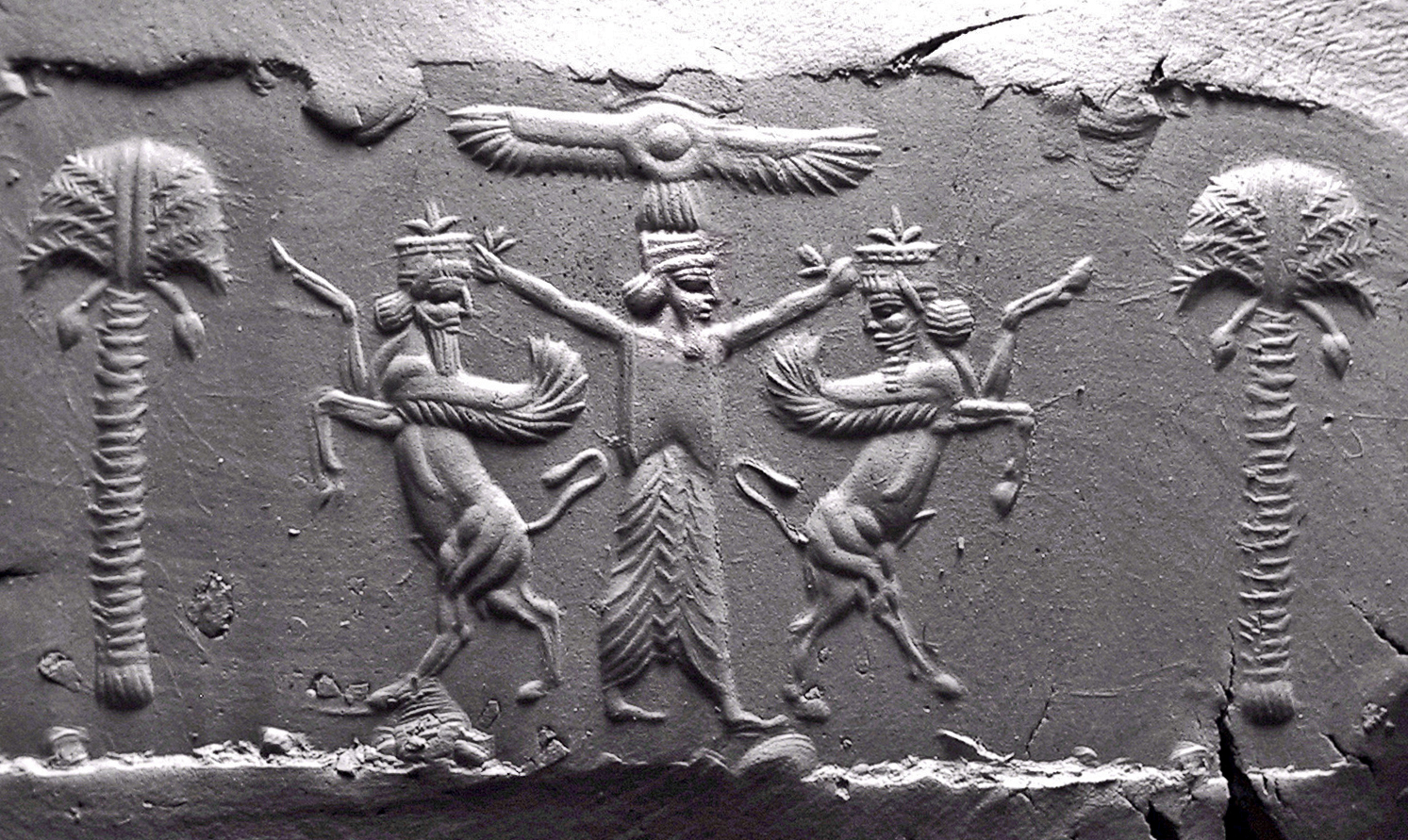
Achaemenid seal impression with the Persian king subduing two Mesopotamian lamassu

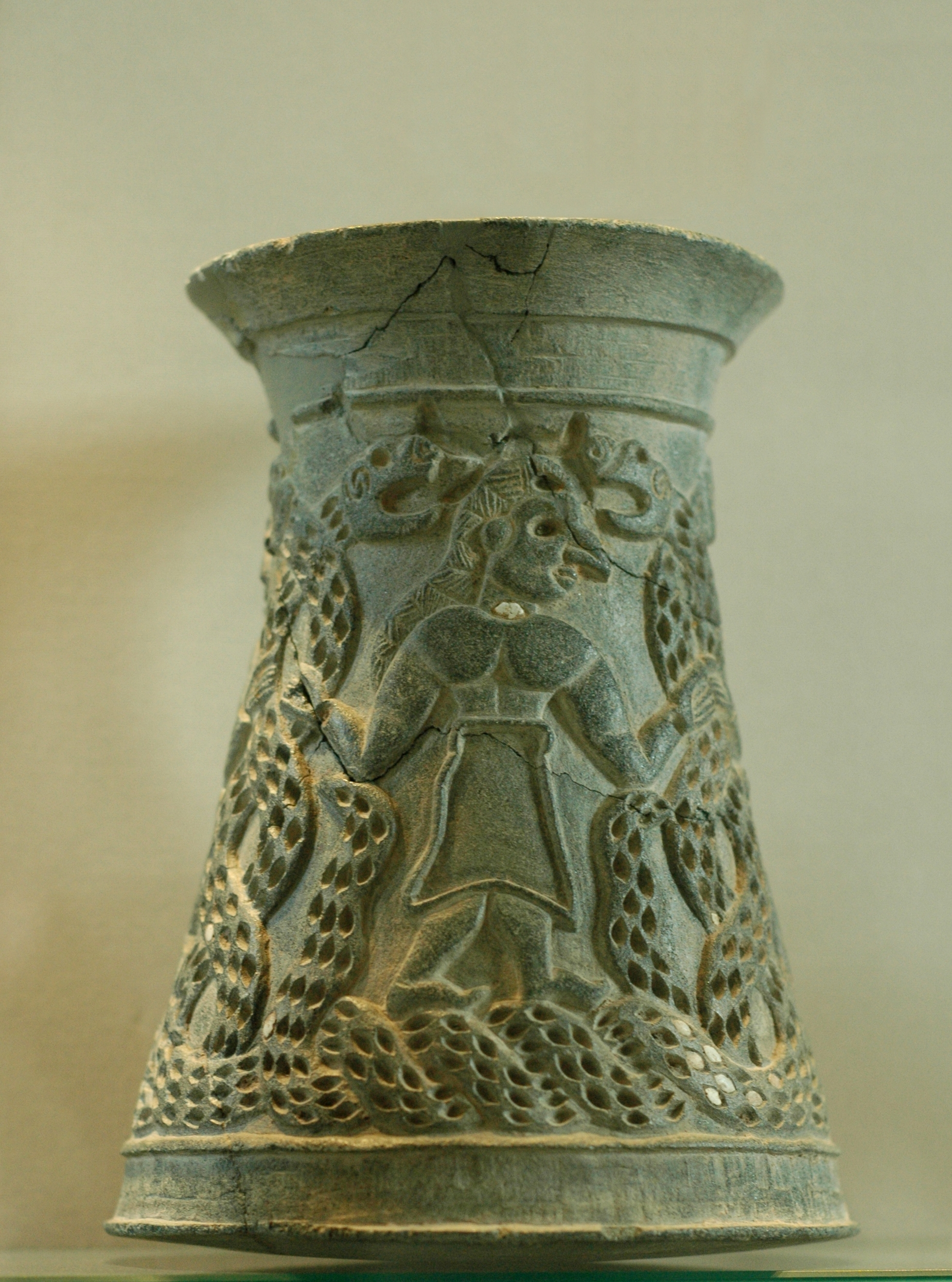
Iranian Master of Animals with two snakes

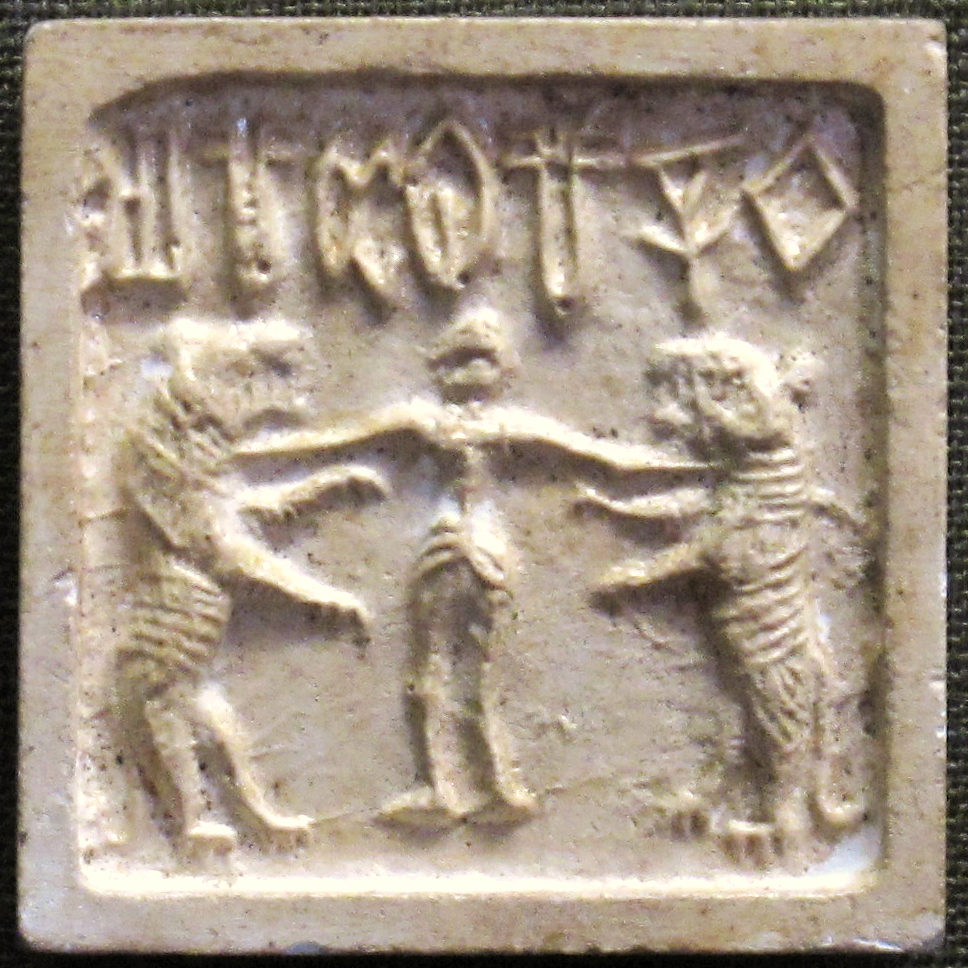
Indus valley civilization seal, with human flanked by two lions (2500–1500 BC).

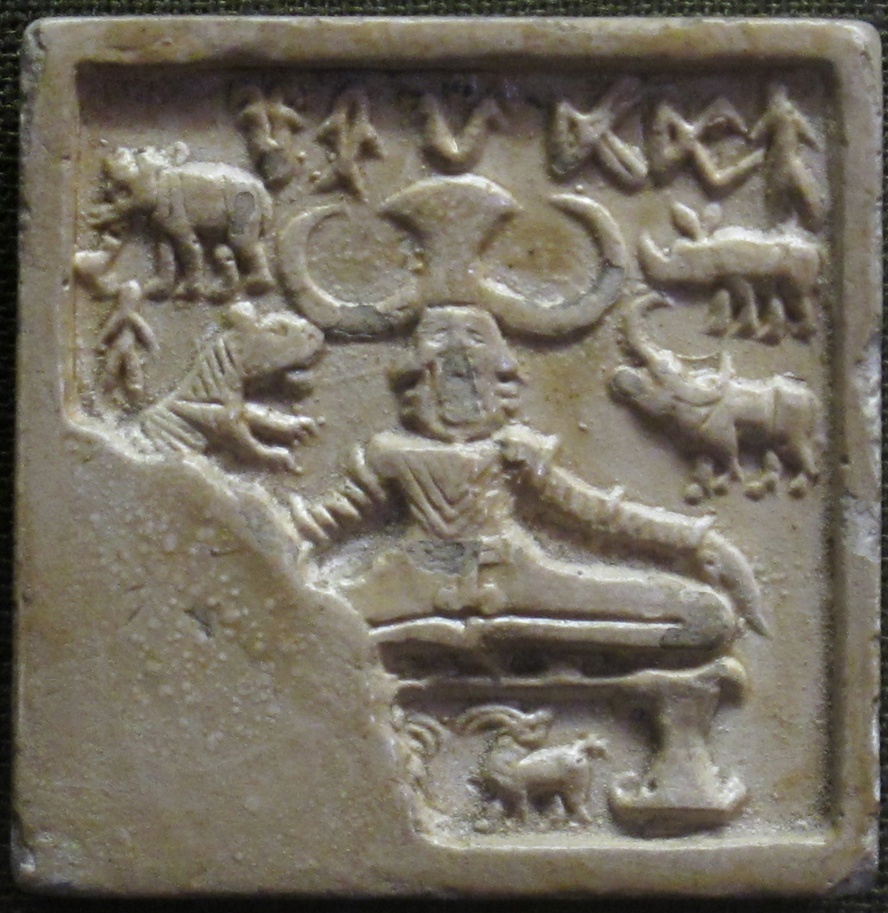
Impression from the Pashupati seal, Indus Valley civilization

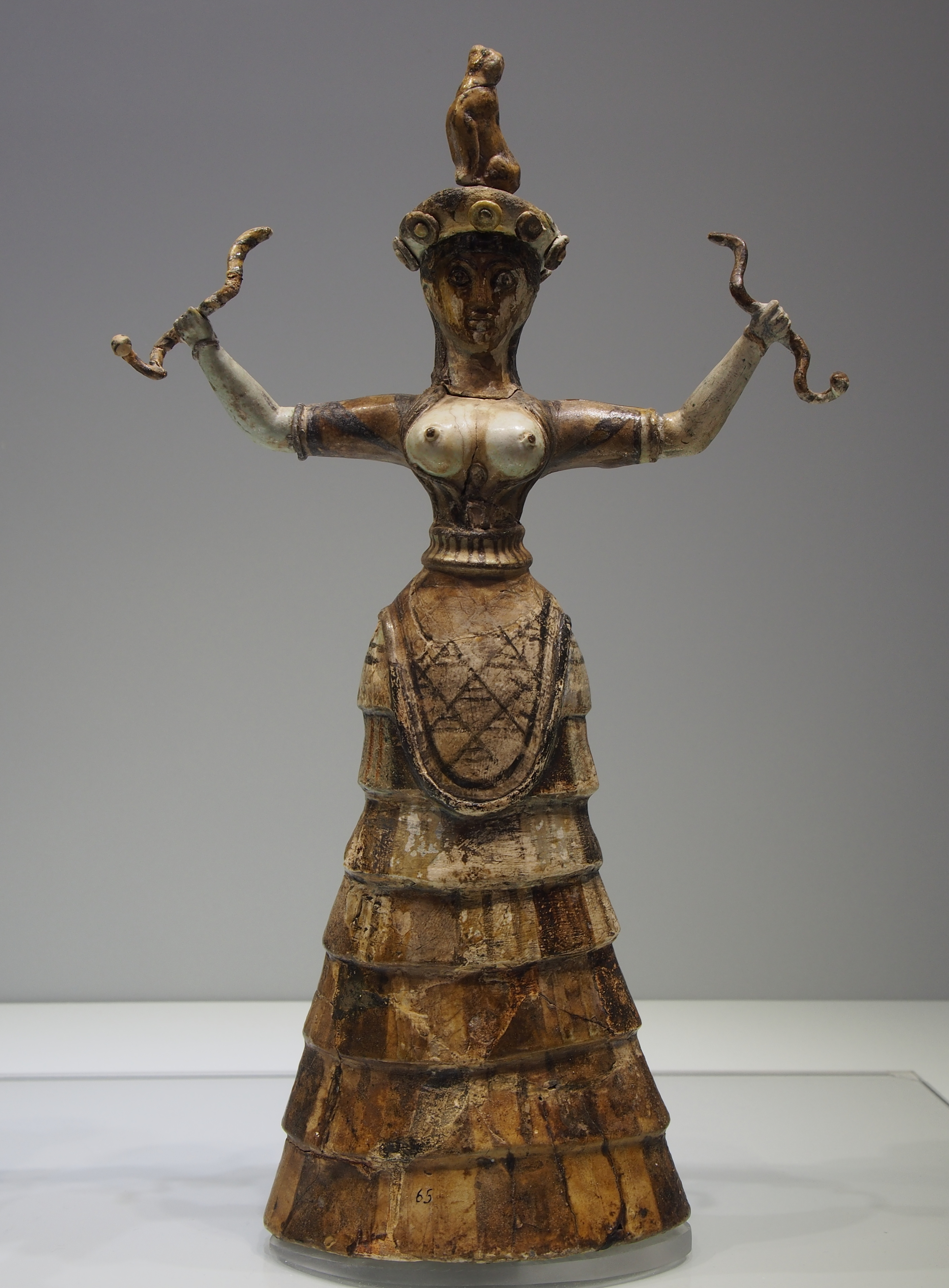
One of the Minoan snake goddess figurines, about 1600 BC

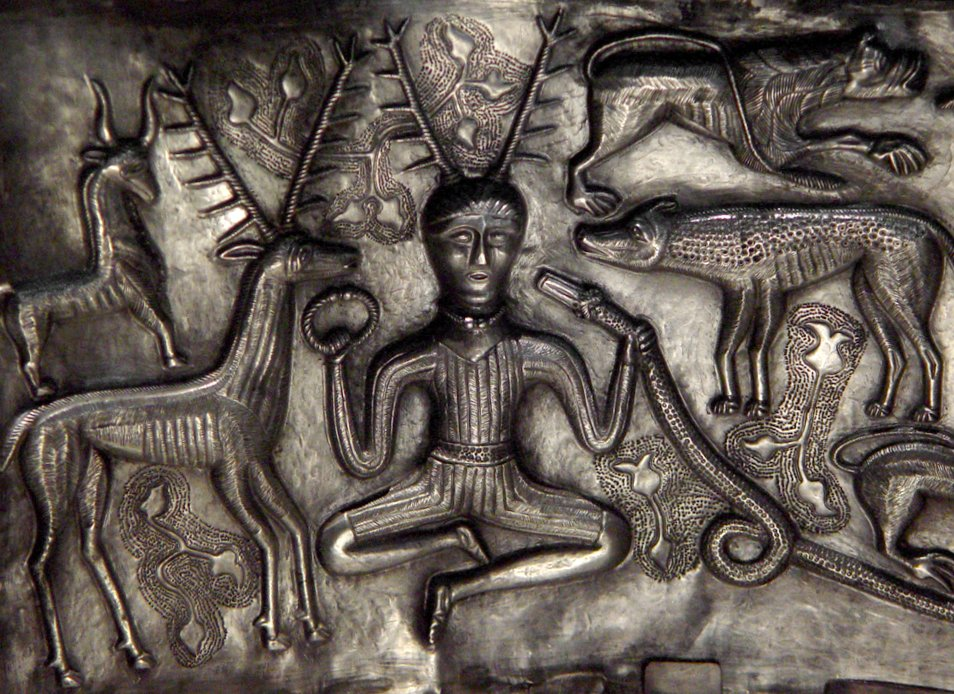
Detail of the Gundestrup Cauldron antlered figure

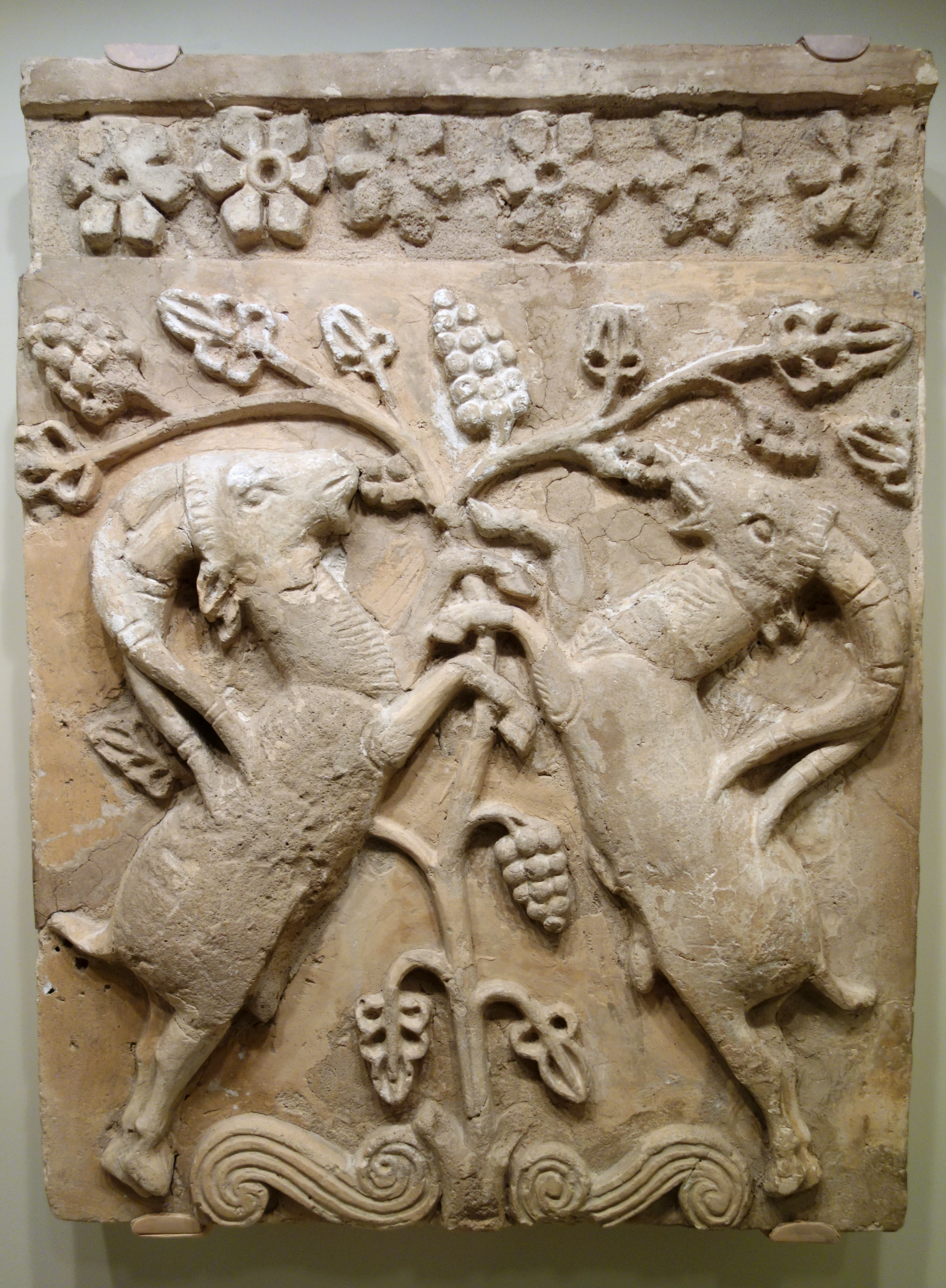
Confronted animals, here ibexes flank a Tree of Life, from Sasanian Iran (fifth or sixth-century AD) (Cincinnati Art Museum)

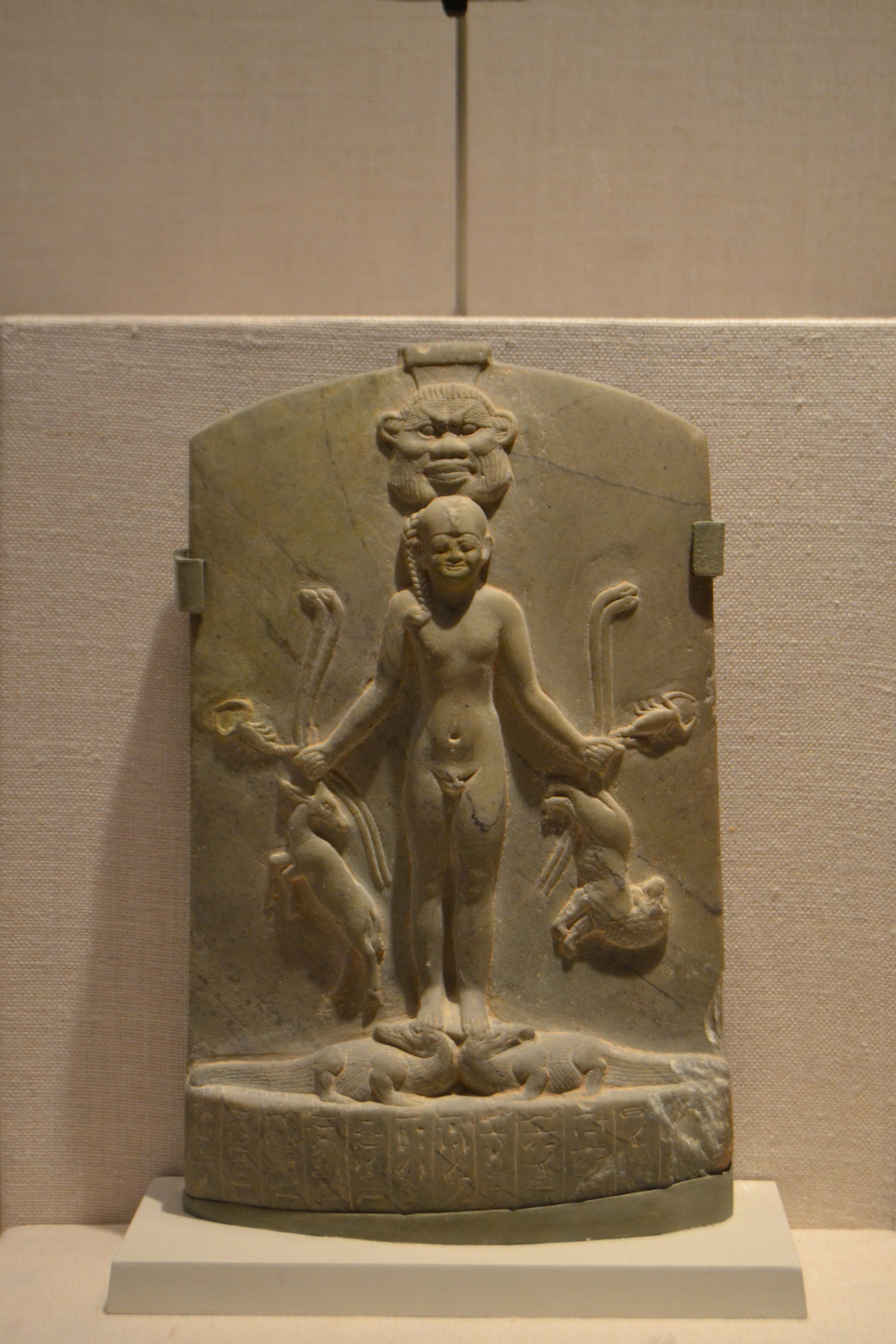
Ptolemaic period (305–30 BC) Egyptian cippus of Horus Museum of Fine Arts, Boston)

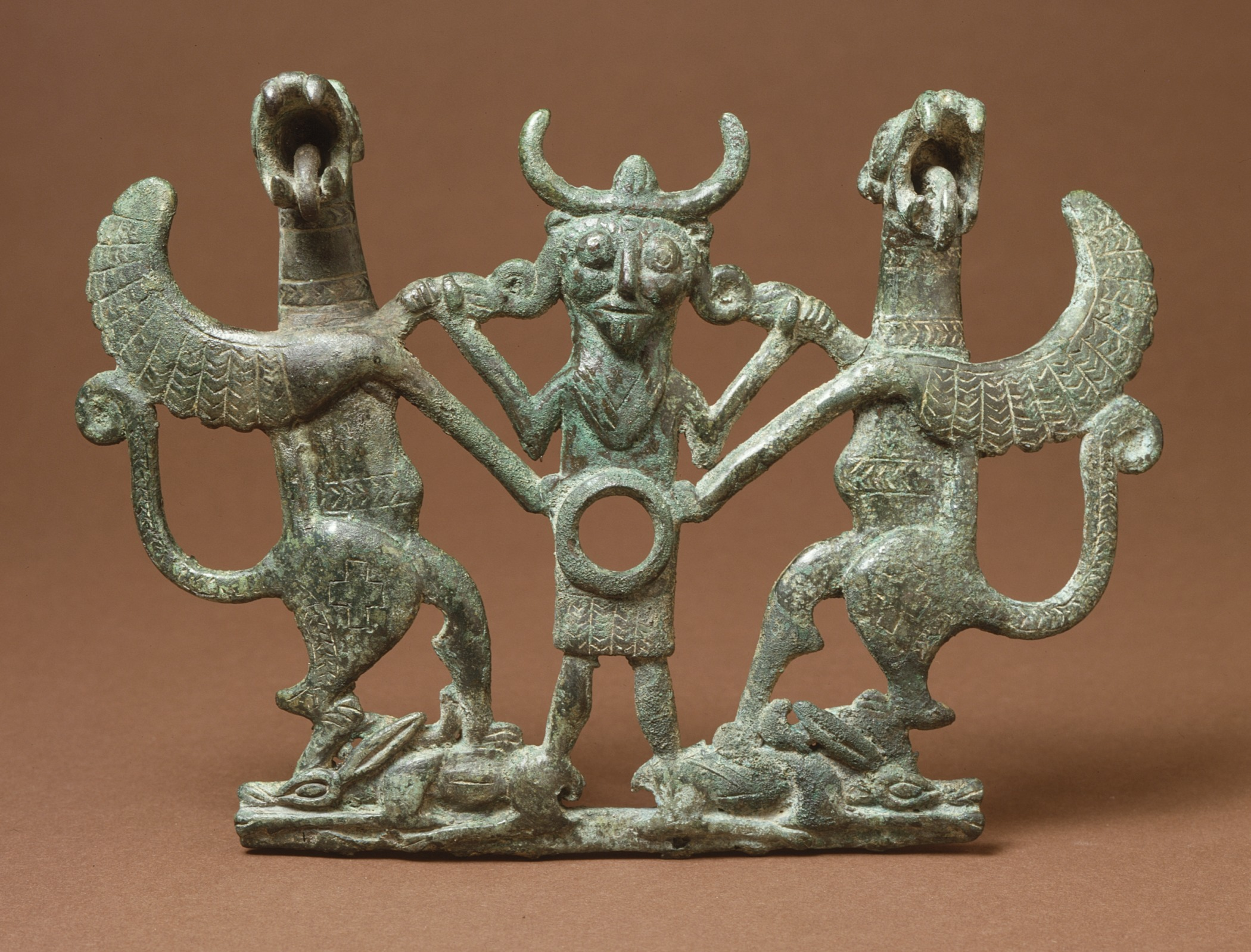
Luristan bronze horse bit cheekpiece with "Master of Animals" motif, about 700 BC

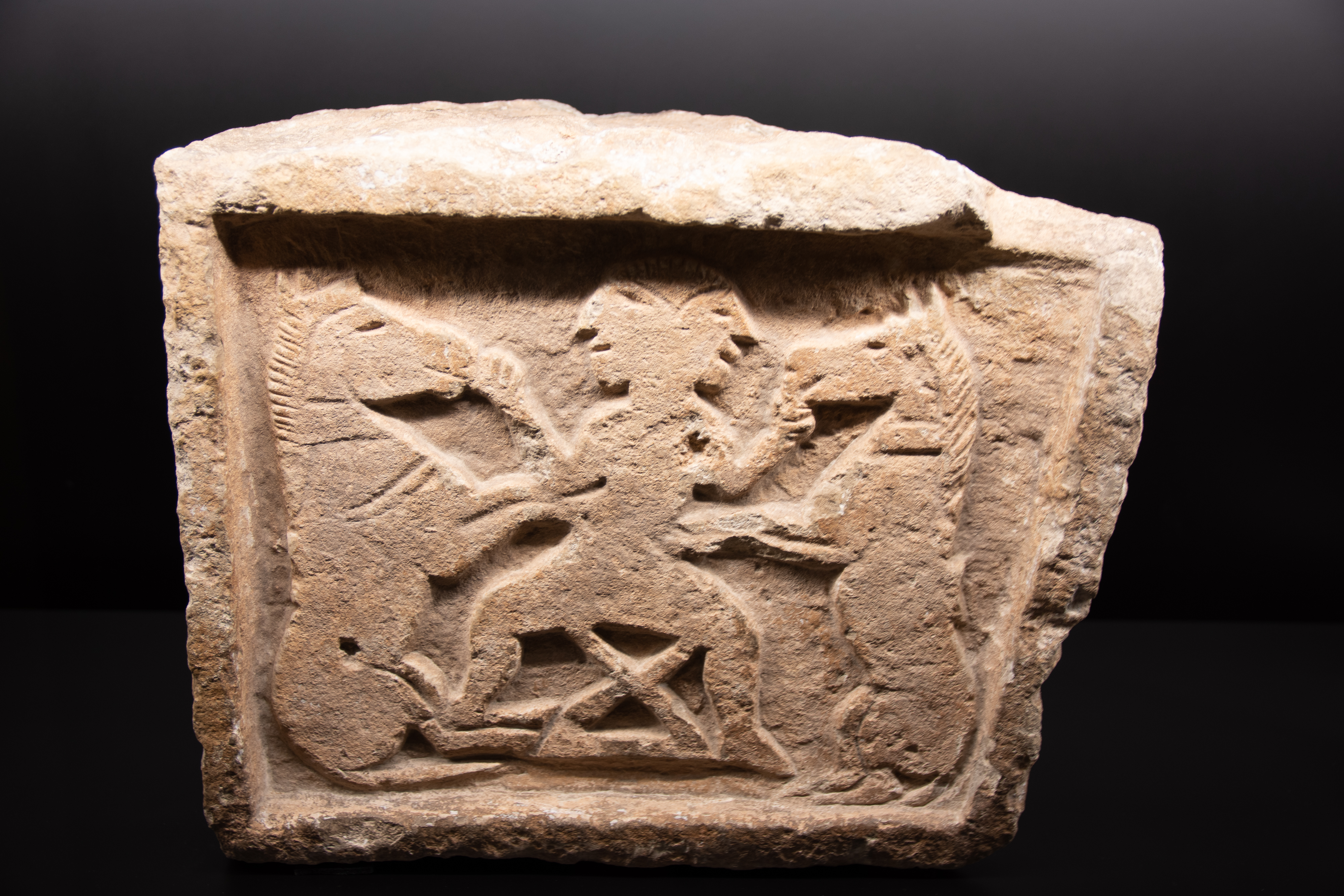
Iberian relief, about 300 BC

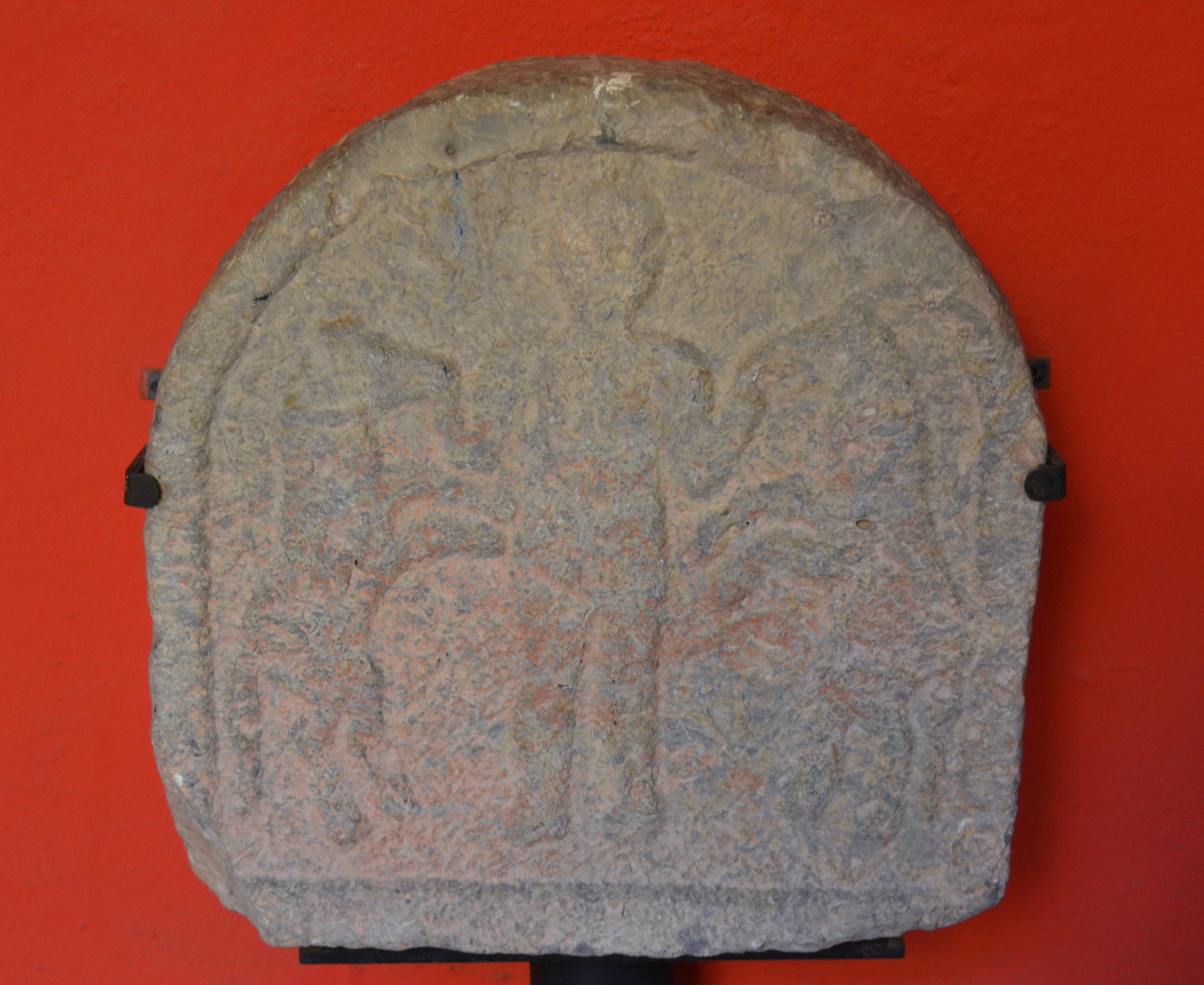
Iberian relief, about 500 BC

== Deity figures ==
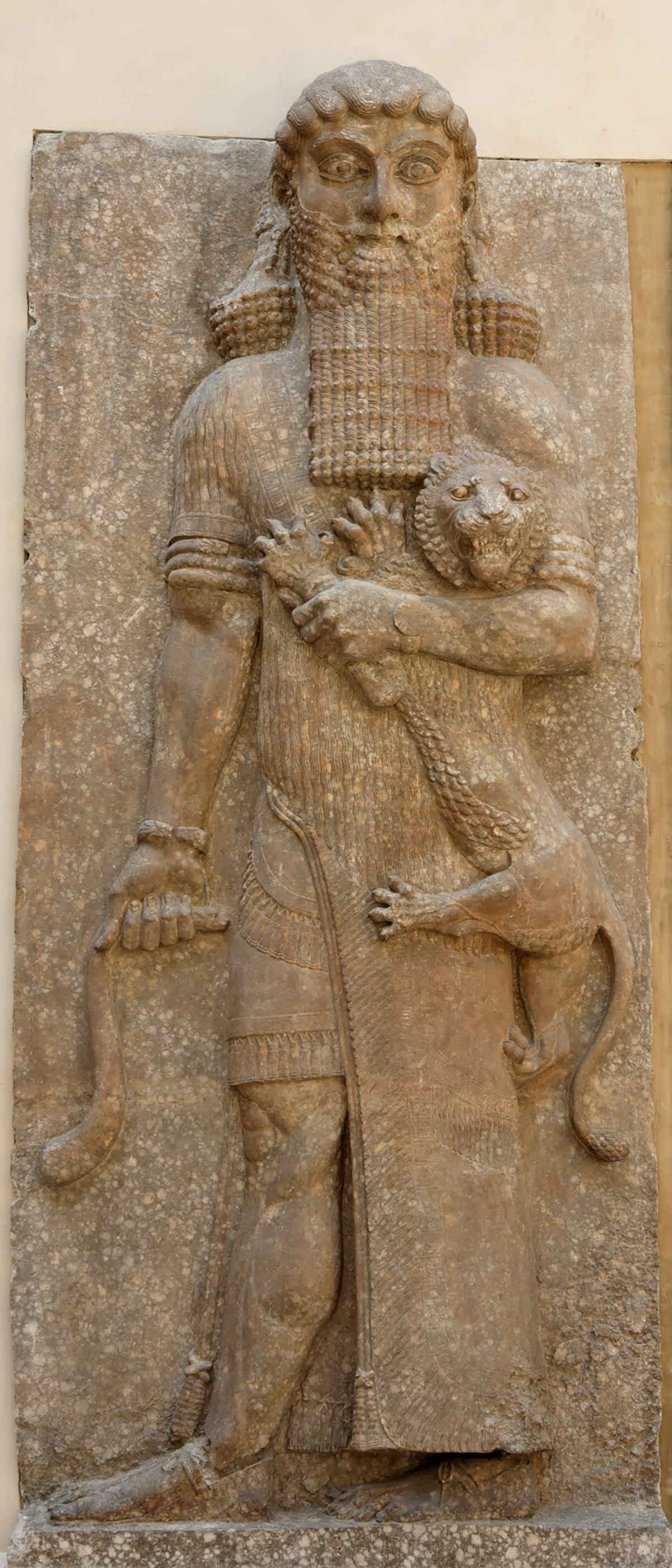
Assyrian hero grasping a lion and a snake

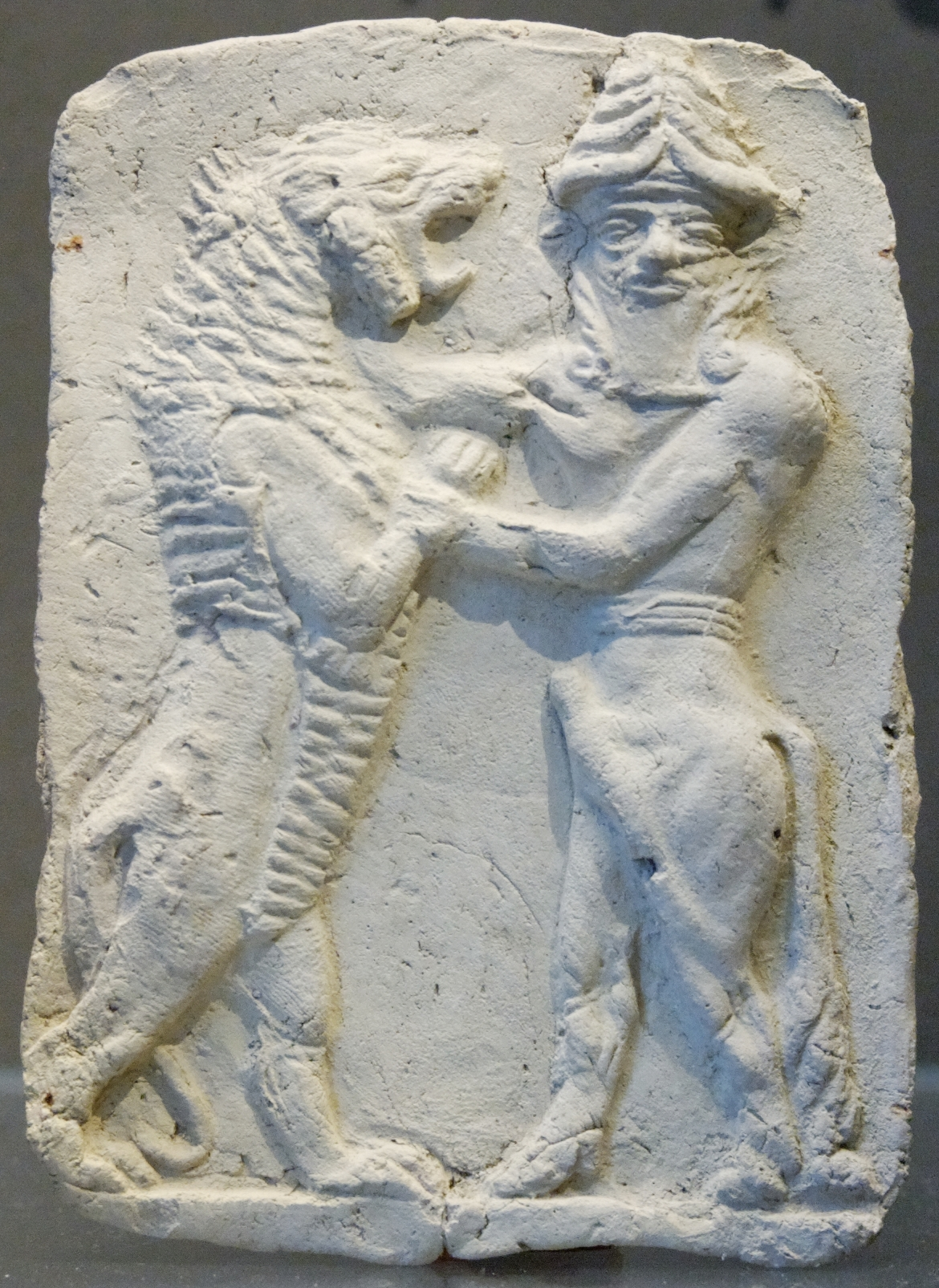
Single bull-man wrestling with a lion, Mesopotamia, 3rd millennium BC

Although such figures are not all, or even usually, deities, the term may be a generic name for a number of deities from a variety of cultures with close relationships to the animal kingdom or in part animal form (in cultures where that is not the norm). These figures control animals, usually wild ones, and are responsible for their continued reproduction and availability for hunters. They sometimes also have female equivalents, the so-called Mistress of the Animals.

Many Mesopotamian examples may represent Enkidu, a central figure in the Ancient Mesopotamian Epic of Gilgamesh. They all may have a Stone Age precursor who was probably a hunter's deity. Many relate to the horned deity of the hunt, another common type, typified by Cernunnos, and a variety of stag, bull, ram, and goat deities. Horned deities are not universal however, and in some cultures bear deities, such as Arktos, might take the role, or even the more anthropomorphic deities who lead the Wild Hunt. Such figures are also often referred to as 'Lord of the forest' or 'Lord of the mountain'.

The Greek god shown as "Master of Animals" is usually Apollo as a hunting deity. Shiva has the epithet Pashupati meaning the "Lord of animals", and these figures may derive from an archetype. Chapter 39 of the Book of Job has been interpreted as an assertion of the deity of the Hebrew Bible as Master of Animals.

== See also ==
- Asherah
