= List of archaeological sites in Erbil Governorate =

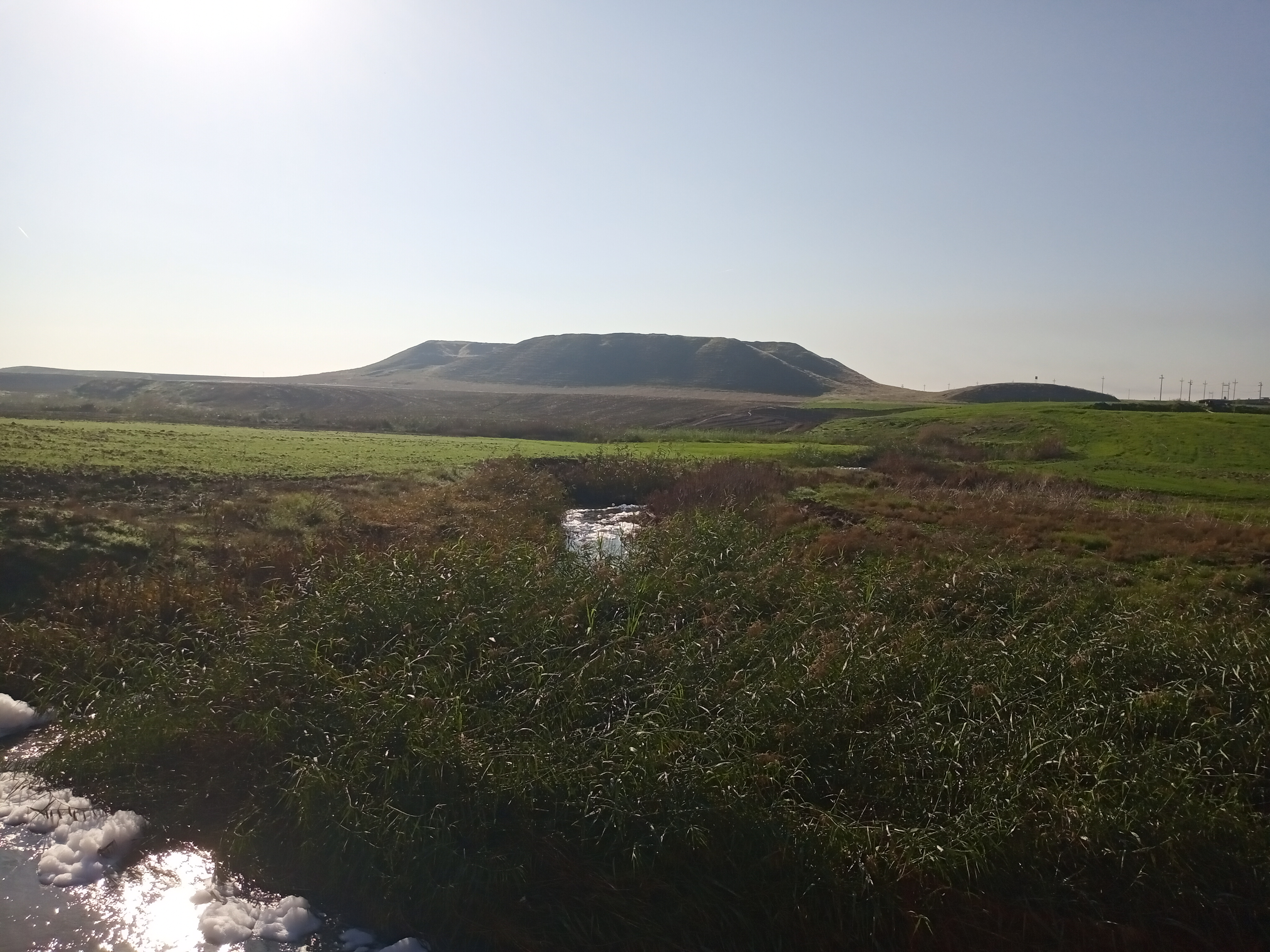

The archaeological sites in Erbil Governorate, Kurdistan Region date back to different historical eras, and it was found through the archaeological survey work that took place in the Erbil governorate that this area included the remains of ancient settlements and cities, the most prominent of which Qalinj Agha Hill, Tell Nadir, Kalak Meshak, Qasra, Lashkry, Aliawa, Helawa, Ali Mawlan, Abdulaziz, Gird Azaban and Kurd Qaburstan.

The ancient names of some of these hills have been discovered, including the hill of Qasr Shamamak, which was the ancient city of (or Kakzu or even Kilizi), and the Kurd Qaburstan suggested linking it to the ancient city of Qabarā.

== List of archaeological sites in Erbil Governorate ==
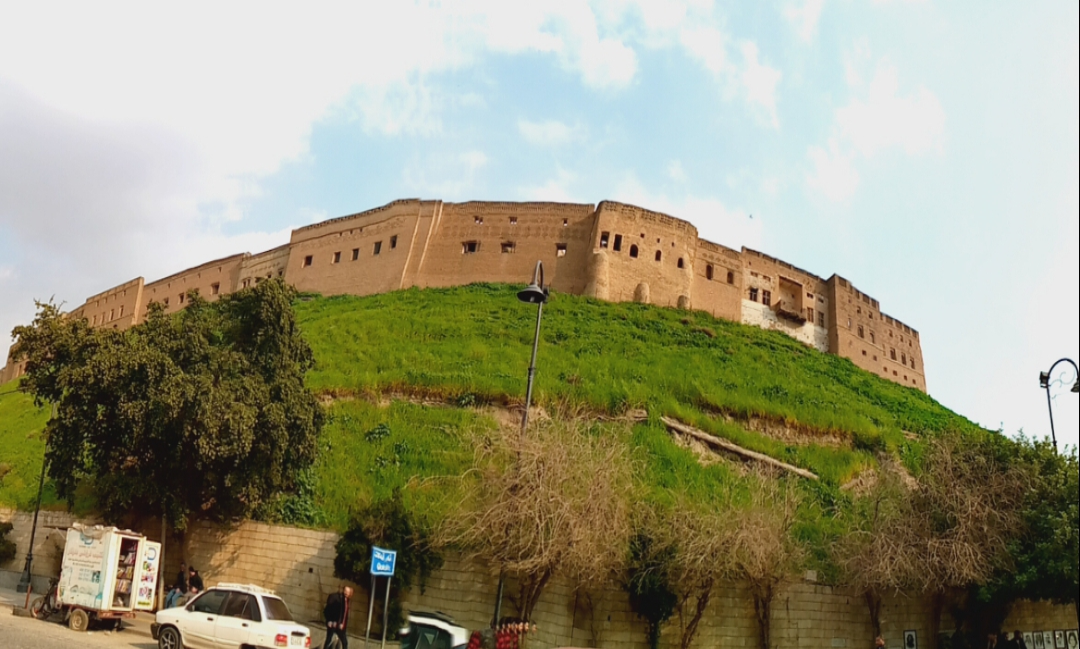
Citadel of Erbil

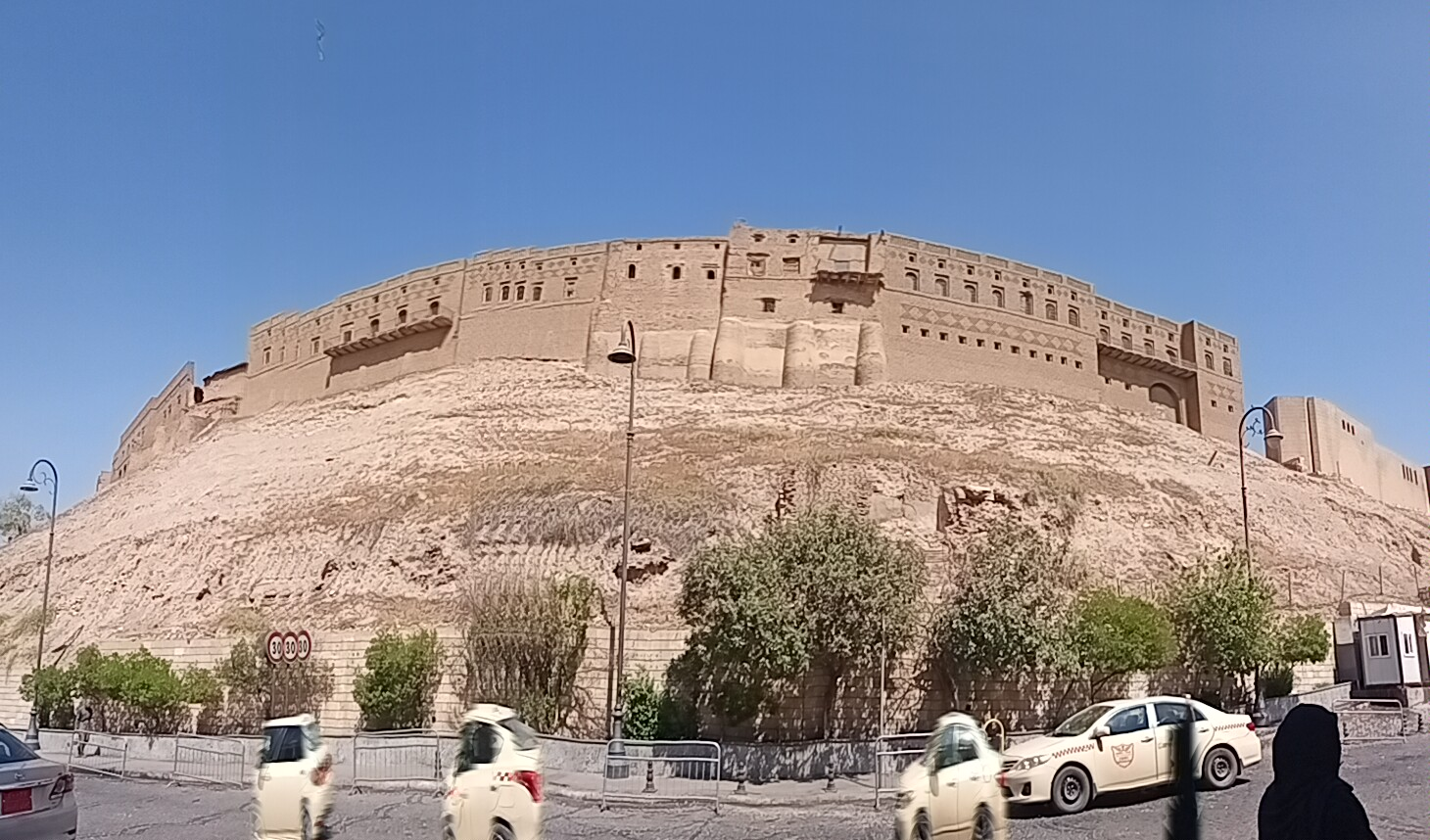
Citadel of Erbil

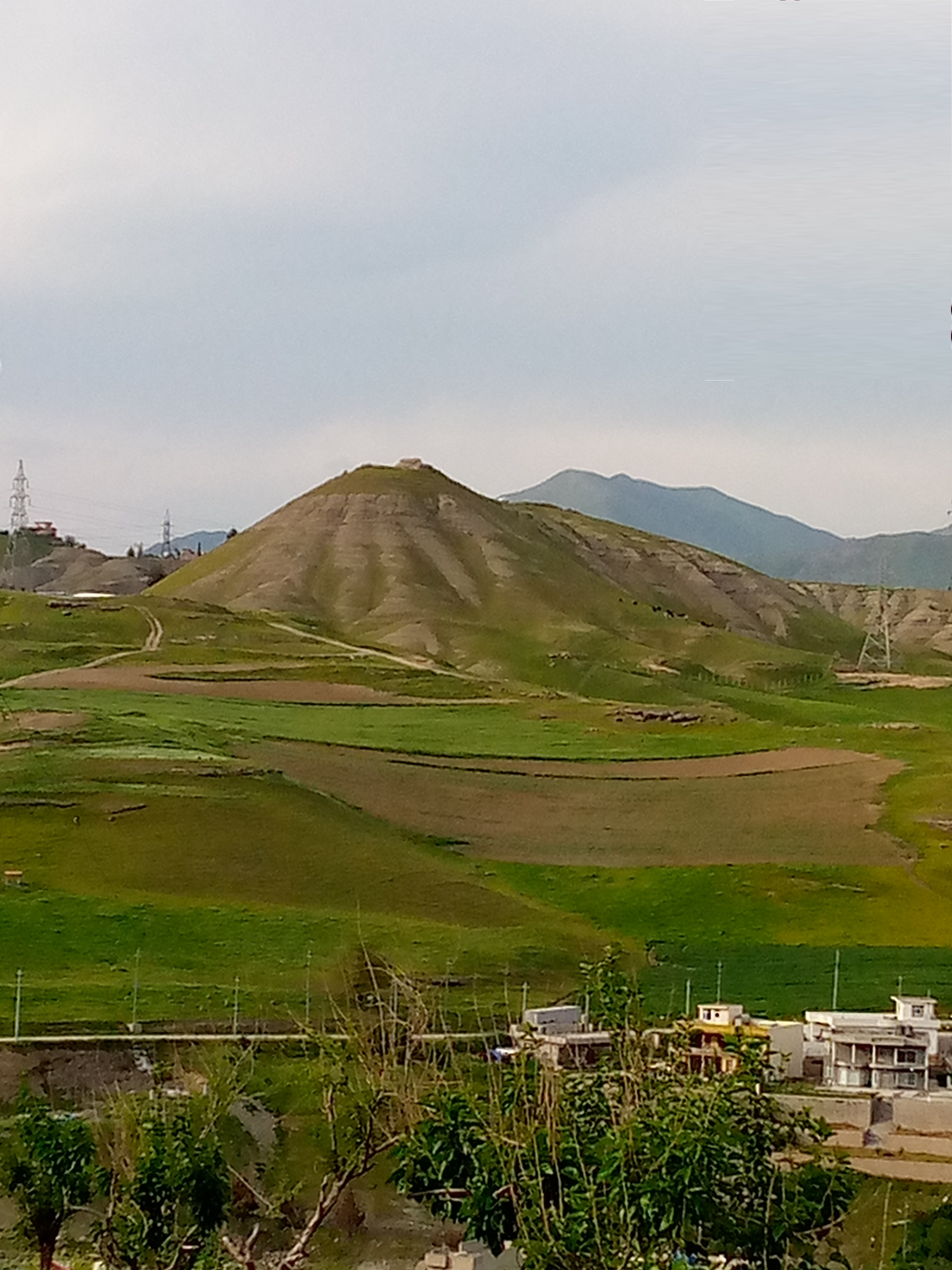
ئيسقه را (Esqara) fort Muhammad Pasha of Rawanduz

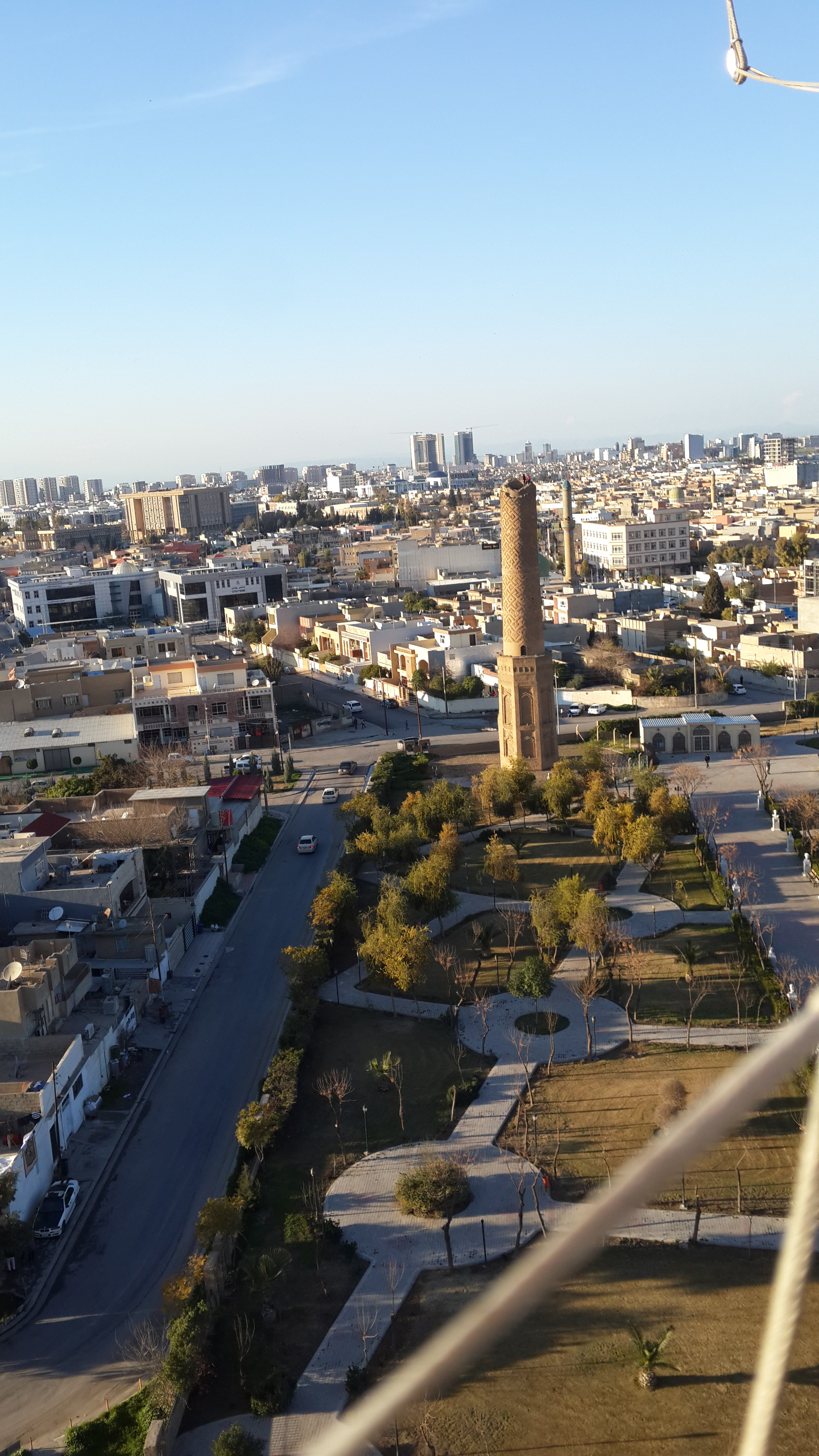
Mudhafaria Minaret

- Dwen Castle
- Shanidar Cave
- Khanzad Castle
- Sātu Qala
- Citadel of Erbil
- Derry Castle
- Seneharib water project
- Aquian castle
- Rost castle
- Aliawa
- Awena
- Bashtepe
- Gird Abdulaziz
- Gird Azaban
- Gird Dusara Fatah
- Gird-i Kawr Gosk
- Girdi Daghan
- Girdi Dalugul
- Girdi Doghan
- Girdi Hassan Agadar
- Girdi Peshka
- Girdi Qatawi
- Girdi Qawagh
- Girdi Qradka
- Girdi Quri Beg
- Girdi Sheikh Ahmed
- Girdi Sorbash Khidr - High
- Girdi Sweri
- Girdi Tandura
- Helawa
- Jadida Lak
- Jmka
- Kurd Qaburstan
- Mastawa
- Minara
- Mrishk Khnken
- Qalat Awena
- Qasawat
- Qawagh village
- Tell Abu Shita
- Tell Baqrta
- Tell Khazna
- Tell Sayid Khidr
- Tell Sheena
- Niska
- Gird-i Qal Ghan
- Murtka Gawra cemetery
- Grd Ashaba
- Dolabakra
- porija cemetery
- Beryat
- khalifa
- Tarjan
- Girdi Damja
- Dusara Jabar
- Abasiya
- Ali Mawlan
- Baghlumnara
- Bastam
- Bir Araban
- Dalugul Khwaru
- Dolaza
- Gameshtapa
- Garasor
- Gird Jotyar
- Gird Lanka village
- Gird Mala
- Gird Qalachogan
- Girda Rasha/Tatarawa
- Girdarasha
- Girdarasha Asad
- Girdi Baba Jahfar
- Girdi Daghan
- Girdi Dowlaza
- Girdi Matrab
- Girdi Pir Dawud
- Girdi Qurshaqlu
- Girdi Shaykh Rasul
- Gird-I Sor
- Girdi Tandura
- Girdi Tazhi Rash
- Gird-i Zaga
- Gozka
- Grd Ashaba
- Grd wasen
- Grd Xateb
- Hazza
- Kamid
- Kawlan
- Kawr Gosk
- Khadjila cemetery
- Kharaba
- Khirbat Dusara
- Khirbat Hassan Brush
- Khirbat Miran
- Khirbat Quj
- Khirbat Shina Maran
- Khrabat Hasan Broosh
- Kilisa
- Kurd Qani - High
- Maqbara Abu Shita
- Maqbarat Permagron
- Maqbarat Shaykh Ismail
- Maqbarat Shaykh Khalak
- Mirawa
- Peymara
- Pilingi Mahmud Agha
- Pilingi Nadr Shah
- Qabrstani Gird Mela
- Qaburstan Qushtapa Kon
- Qaburstan Razan
- Qach Rresh
- Qalat Awena
- Qalinj Agha
- Qasr Shemamok
- Qalat Girda Sher
- Qazi Khana
- Qopaqran
- Qushtapa kon
- Qushtapa
- Said Salman
- Sarawa
- Sha ban shar
- Sheikh Musl
- Sherawa
- Sheraya
- Sorbash Kakala
- Surezha
- Tandura village
- Tell Abu Jerda
- Tell Barur
- Tell Lashkry
- Tell Qadriya
- Timari Gawra
- Tirpa Spiyan
- Zaga
- Kawlan
- Kawr Gosk
- Kaznazan
- Khadjila cemetery
- Kharaba
- Khirbat Dusara
- Khirbat Hassan Brush
- Khirbat Miran
- Khirbat Shina Maran
- Khrabat Hasan Broosh
- Kilisa
- Kurd Qani
- Mamustayani Nuway
- Maqbara Abu Shita
- Maqbarat Permagron
- Maqbarat Shaykh Ismail
- Maqbarat Shaykh Khalak
- Mirawa
- Peymara
- Pilingi Mahmud Agha
- Pilingi Nadr Shah
- Qabrstani Gird Mela
- Qaburstan Qushtapa Kon
- Qaburstan Razan
- Qalat Awena
- Qalat Girda Sher
- Qazi Khana
- Qopaqran
- Qushtapa kon
- Qushtapa
- Said Salman
- Sarawa
- Sha ban shar
- Sheikh Musl
- Sherawa
- Sheraya
- Sorbash Kakala
- Surezha
- Tandura village
- Tell Abu Jerda
- Tell Barur
- Tell Lashkry
- Tell Qadriya
- Timari Gawra
- Tirpa Spiyan
- Wasta Rajab Cannon (Rawanduz)
- Zaga

== Gallery ==
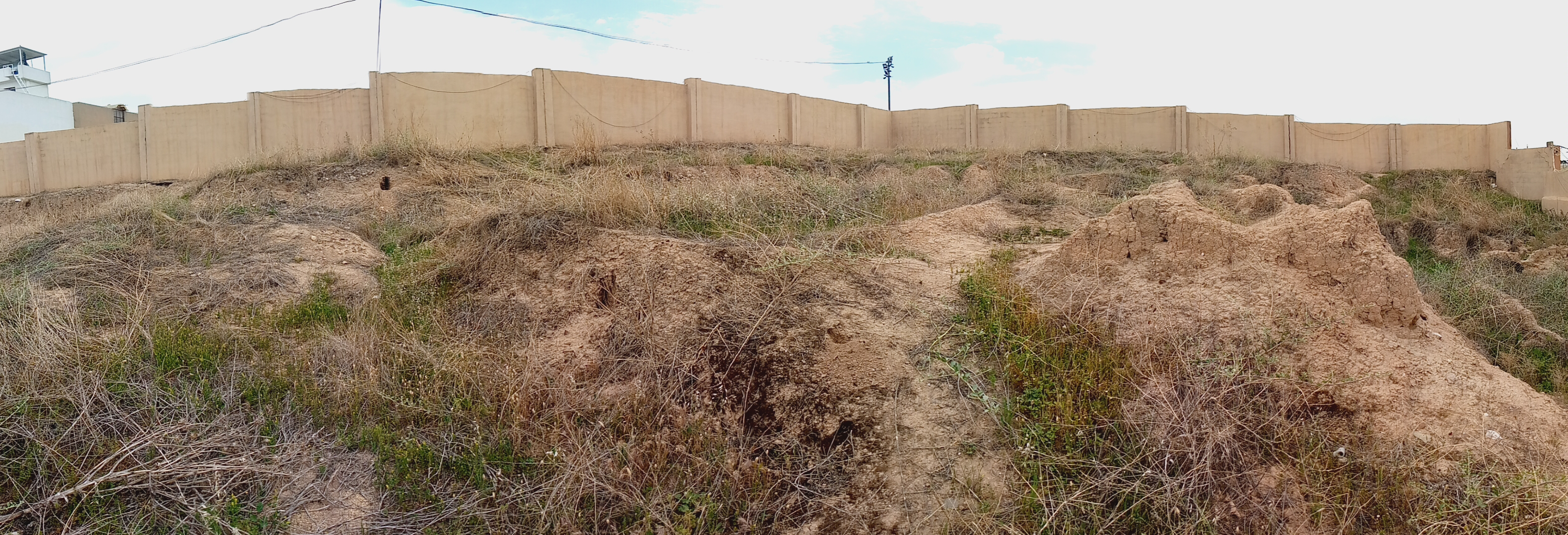
Tell Qaling Agha

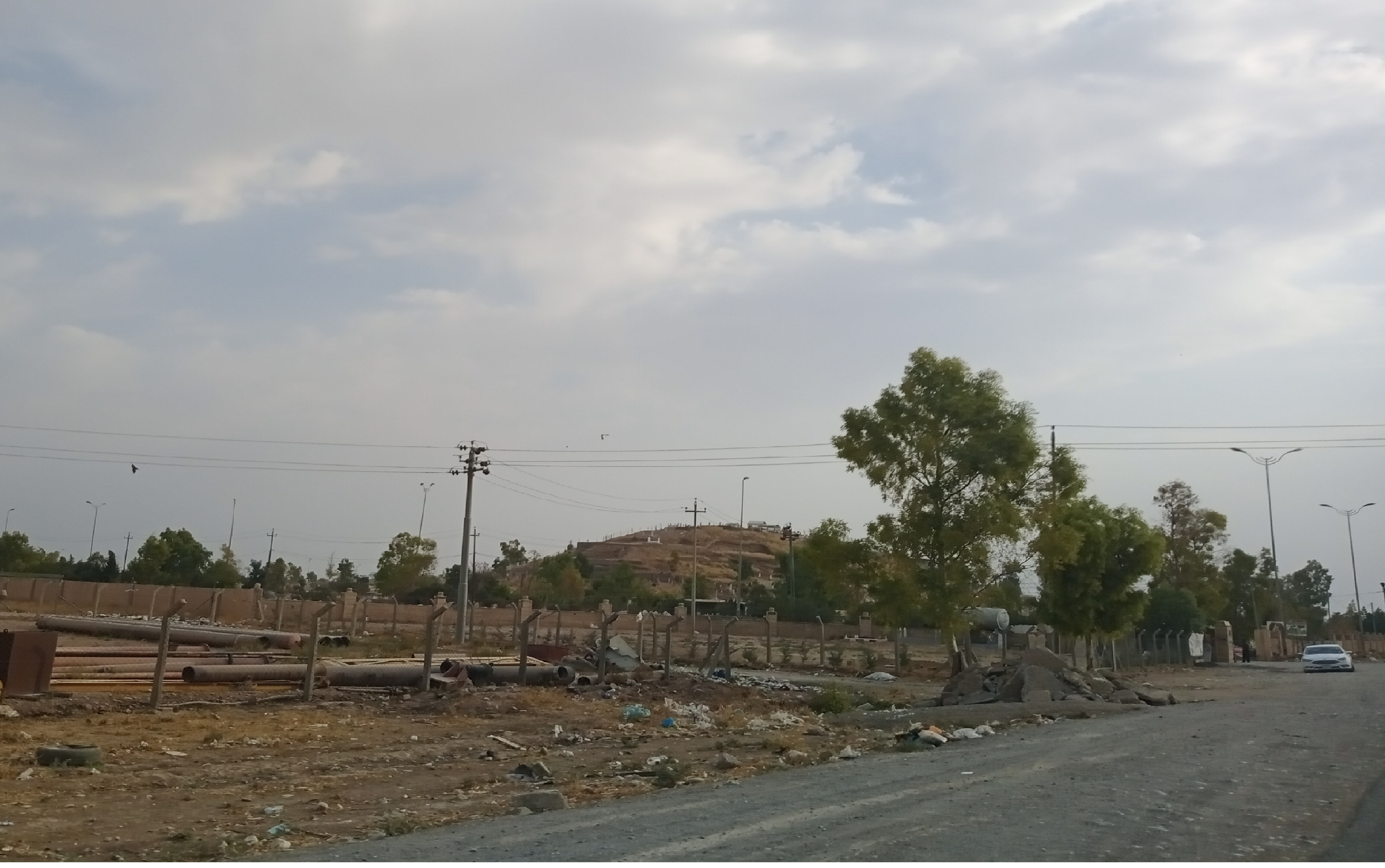
Girdi Pir Dawud

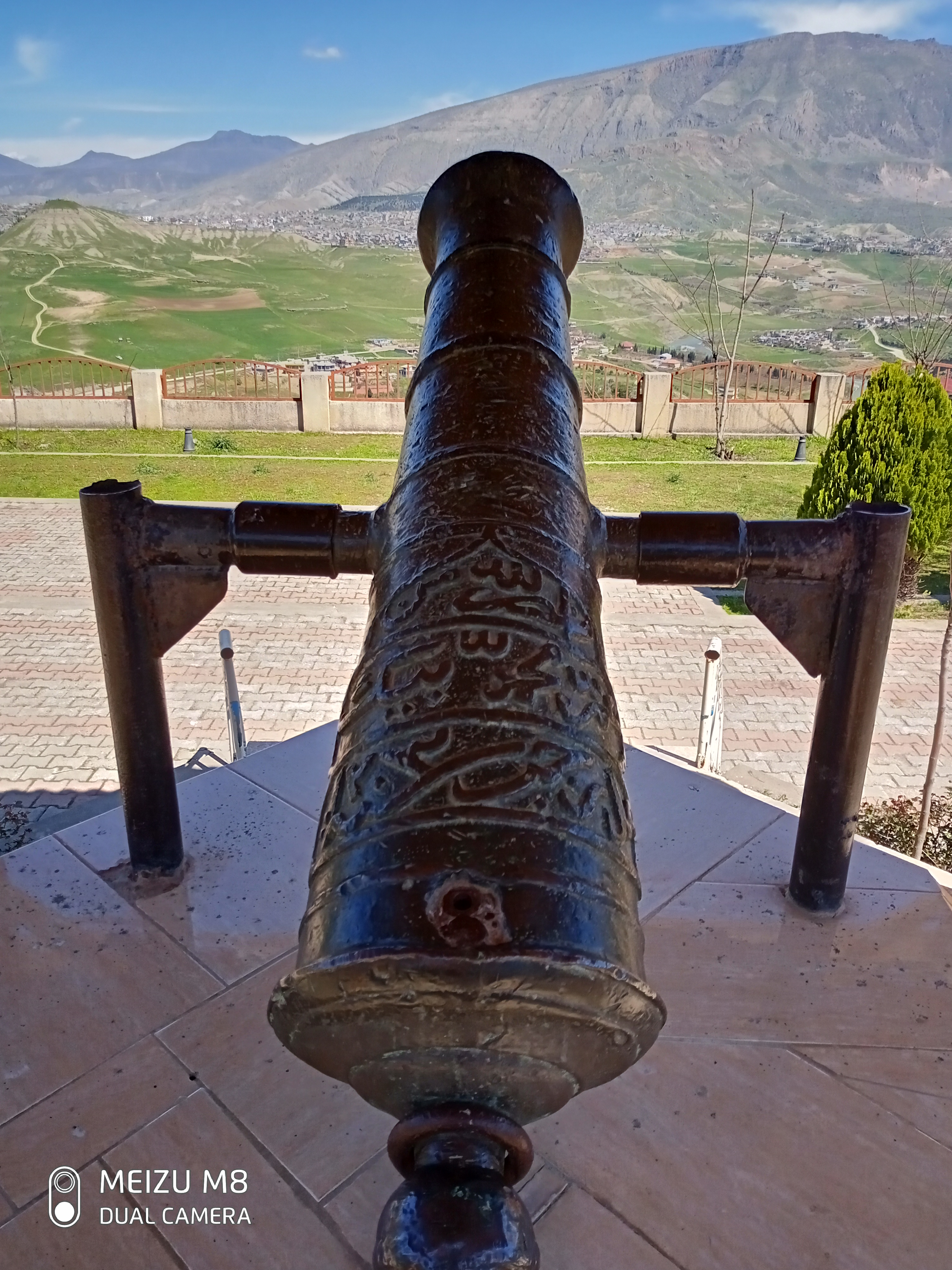
Wasta Rajab Cannon in Rawanduz

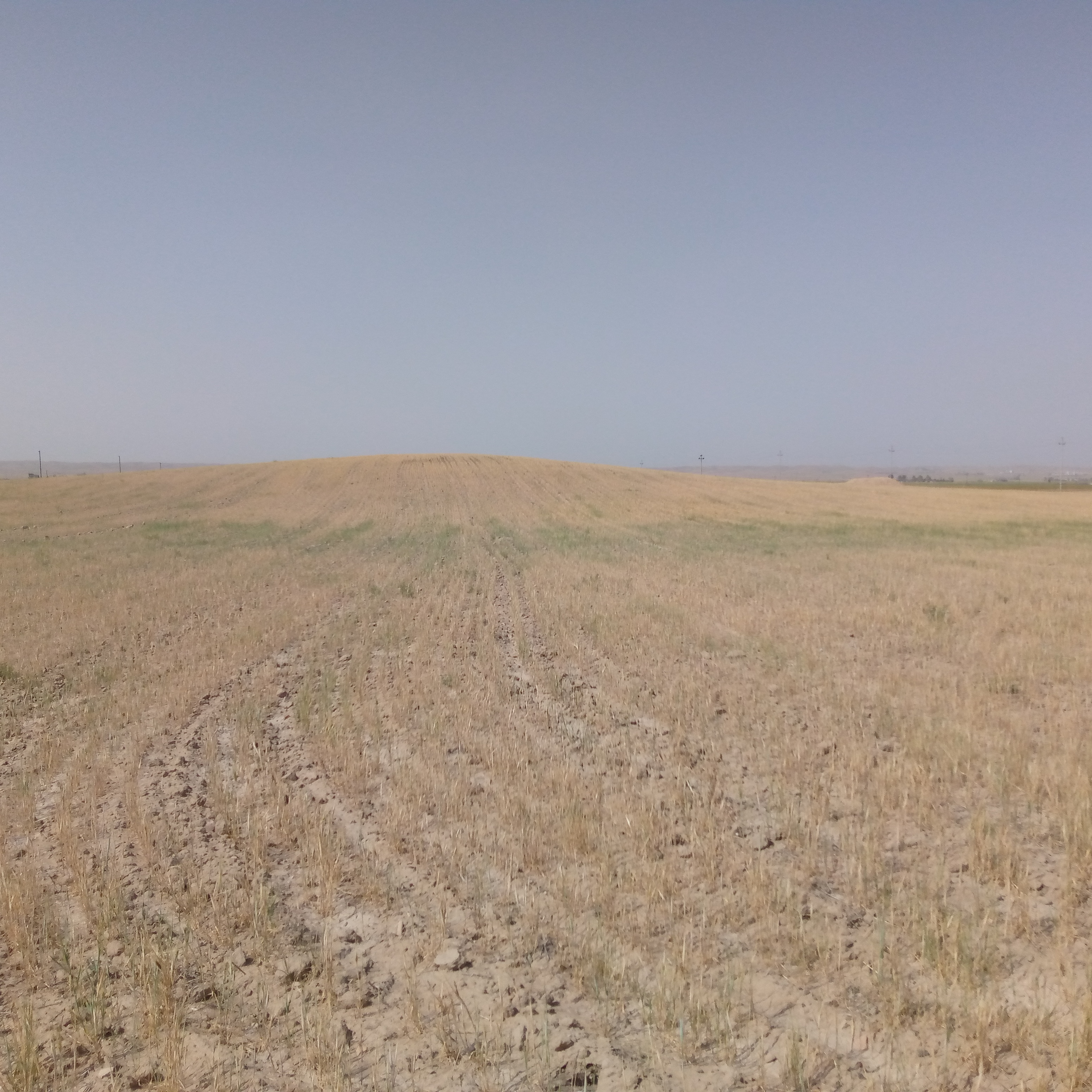
metrab hill

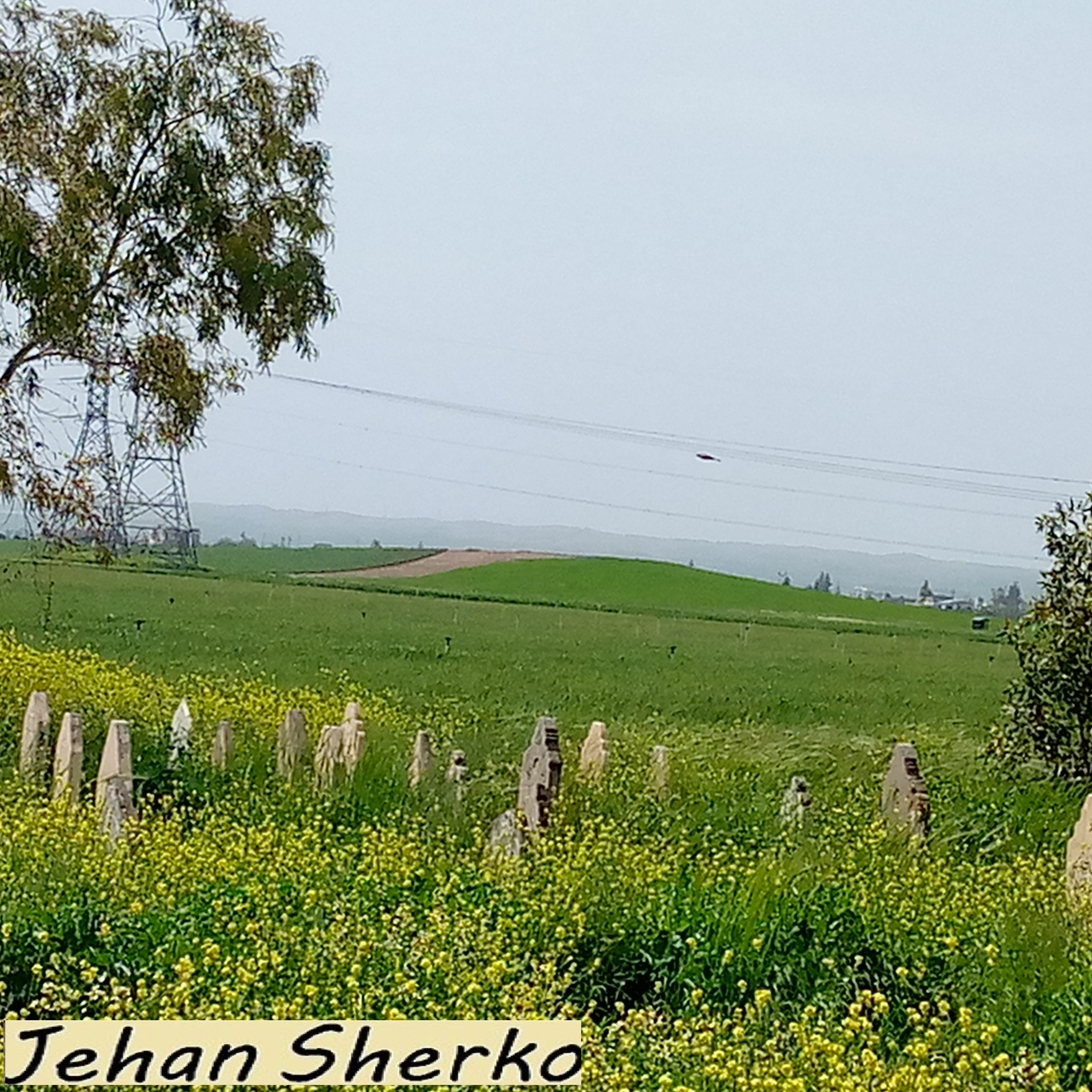
Khirbat Miran

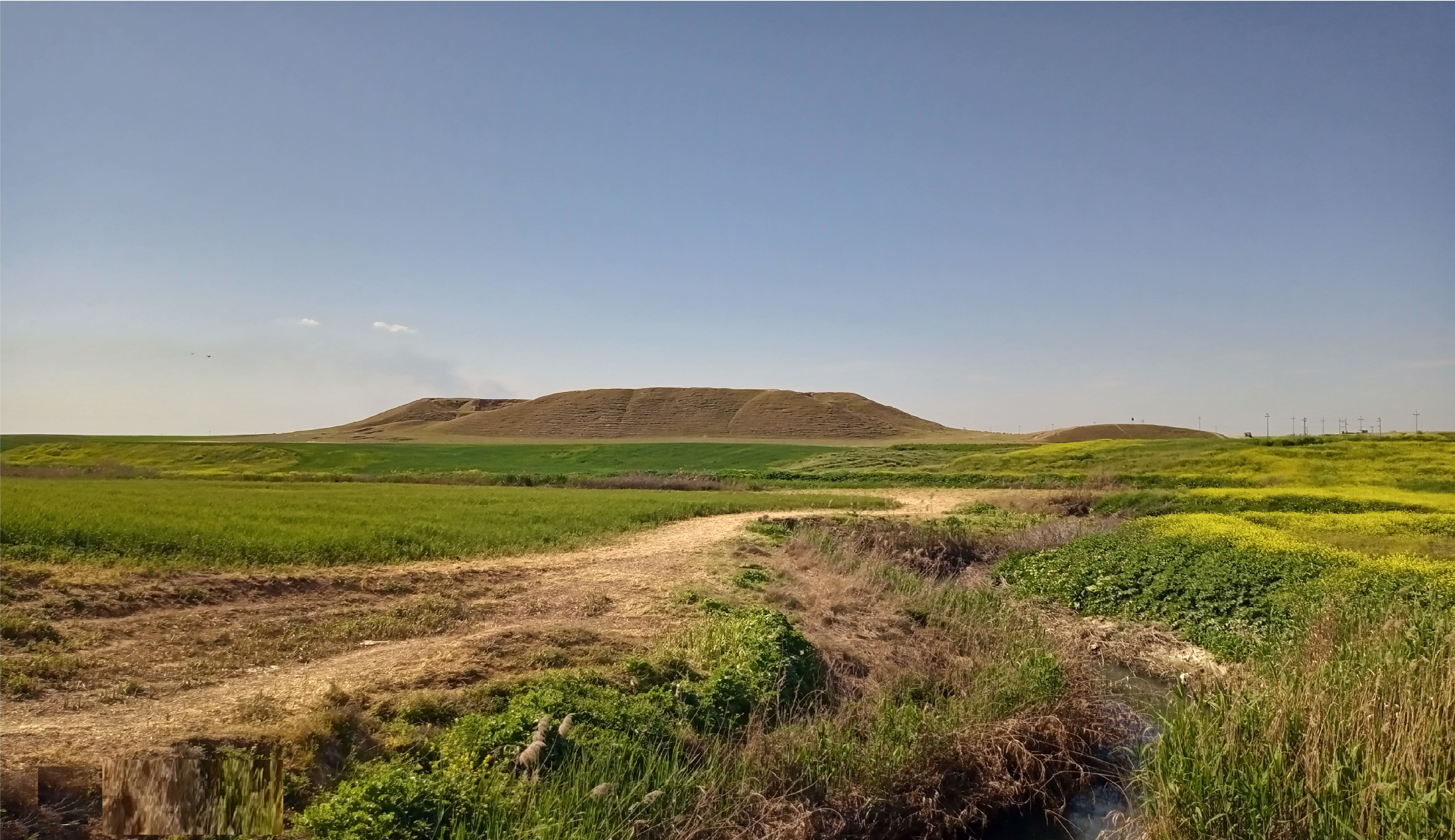
Qasr Shamamok

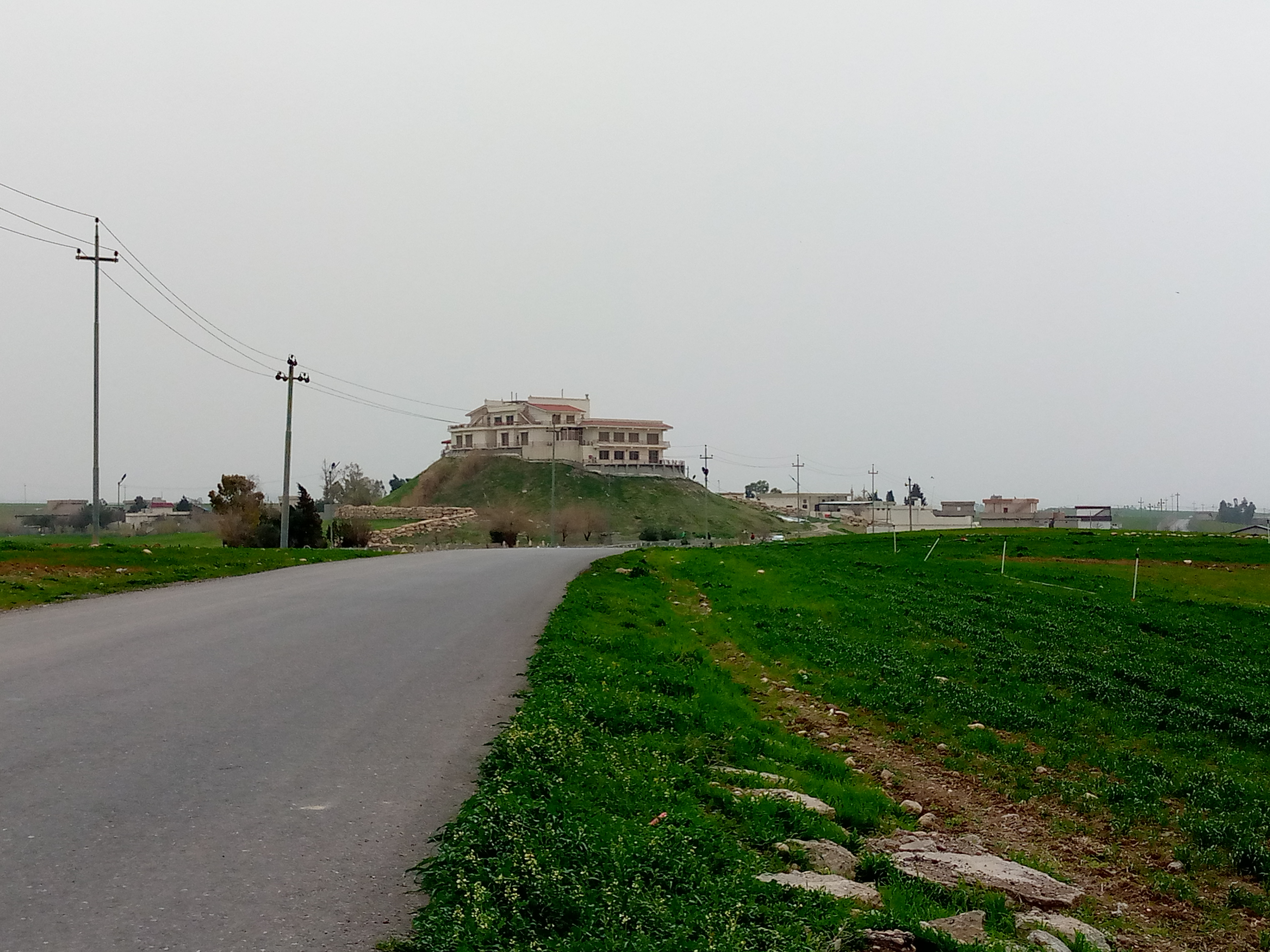
Arak hill

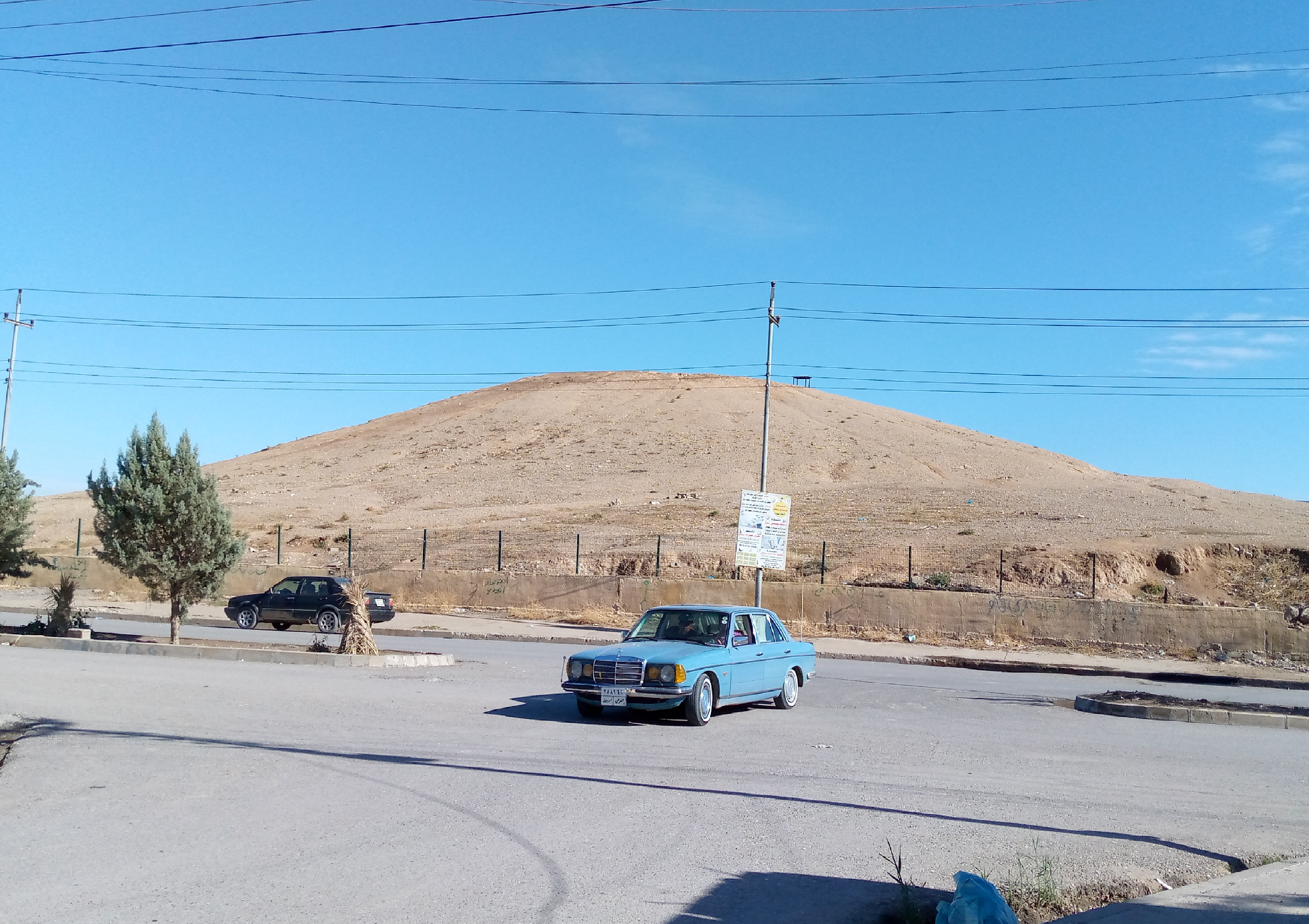
Qushtapa kon

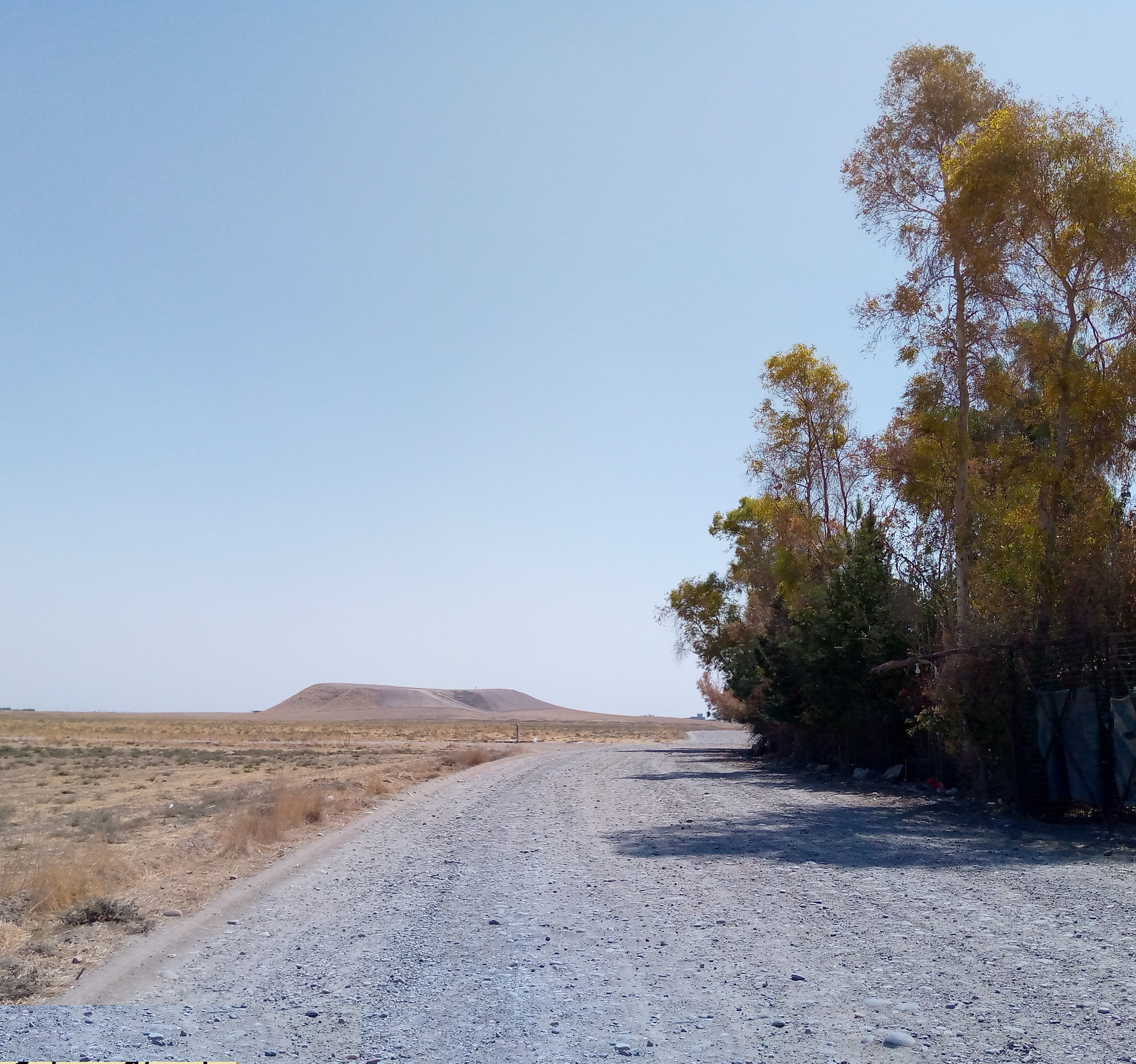
Tell Baqrta

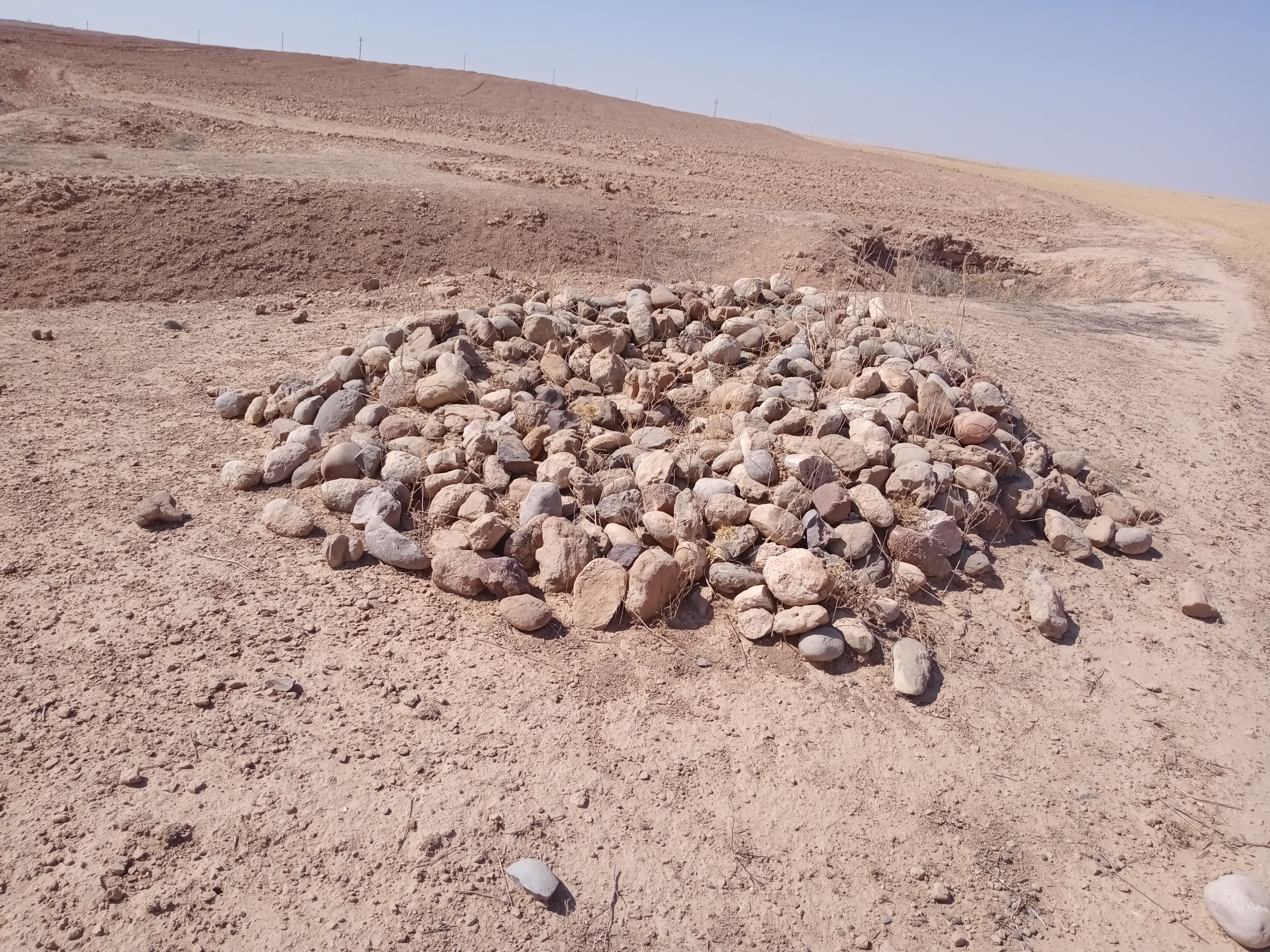
Omar Mandani's grave in the village of Dole Bakra

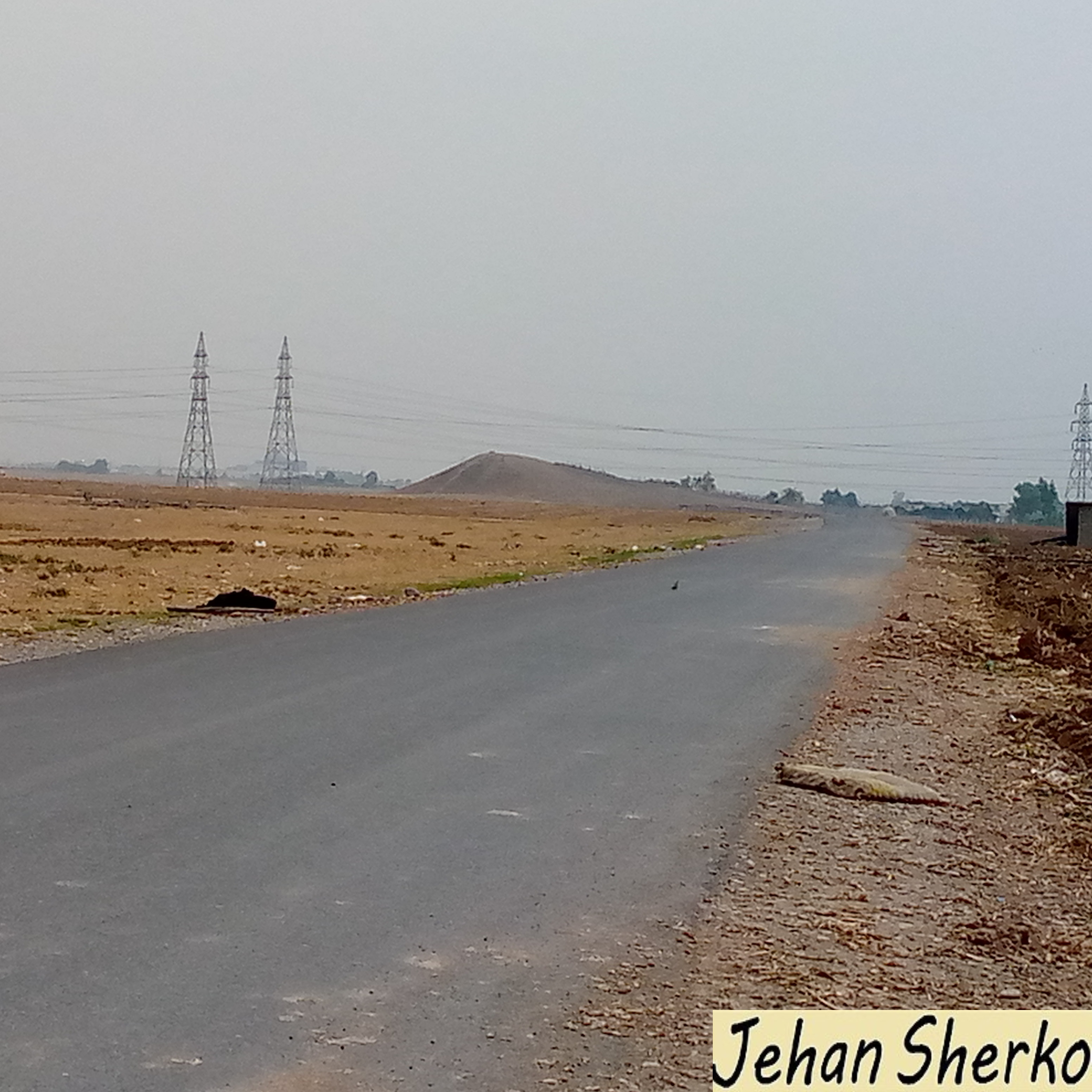
Beryat

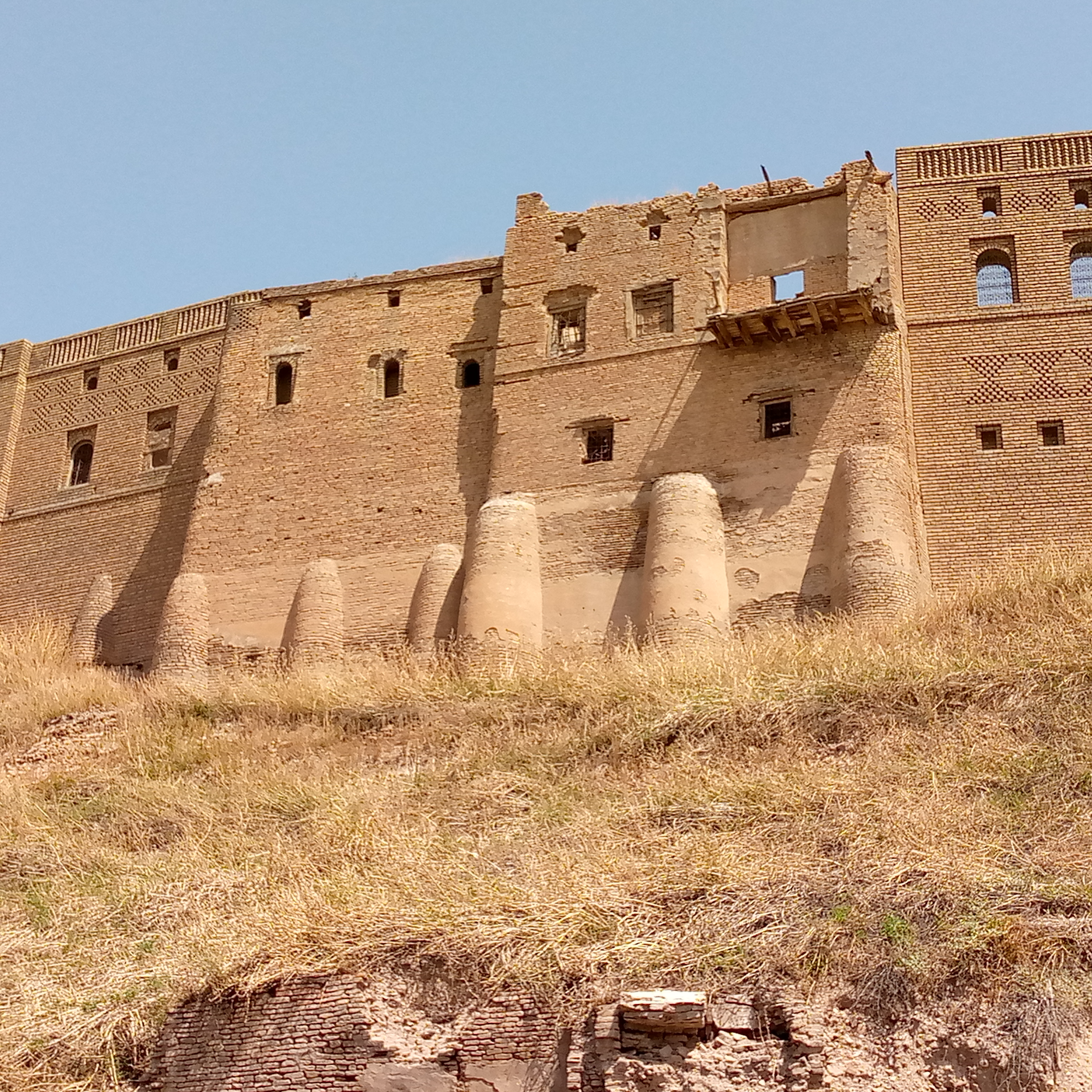
Erbil Citadel

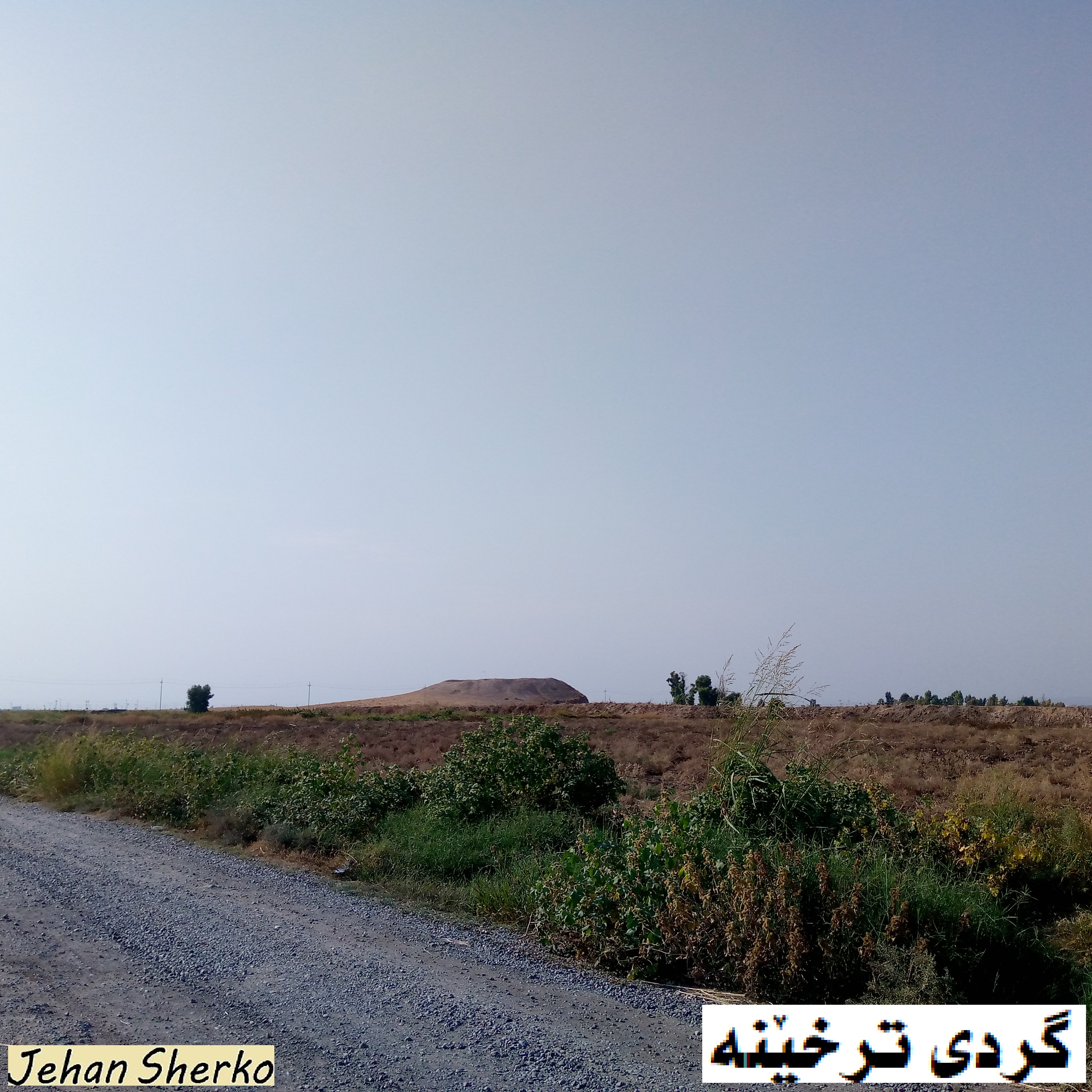
Tell Tarkhina in Tandura village

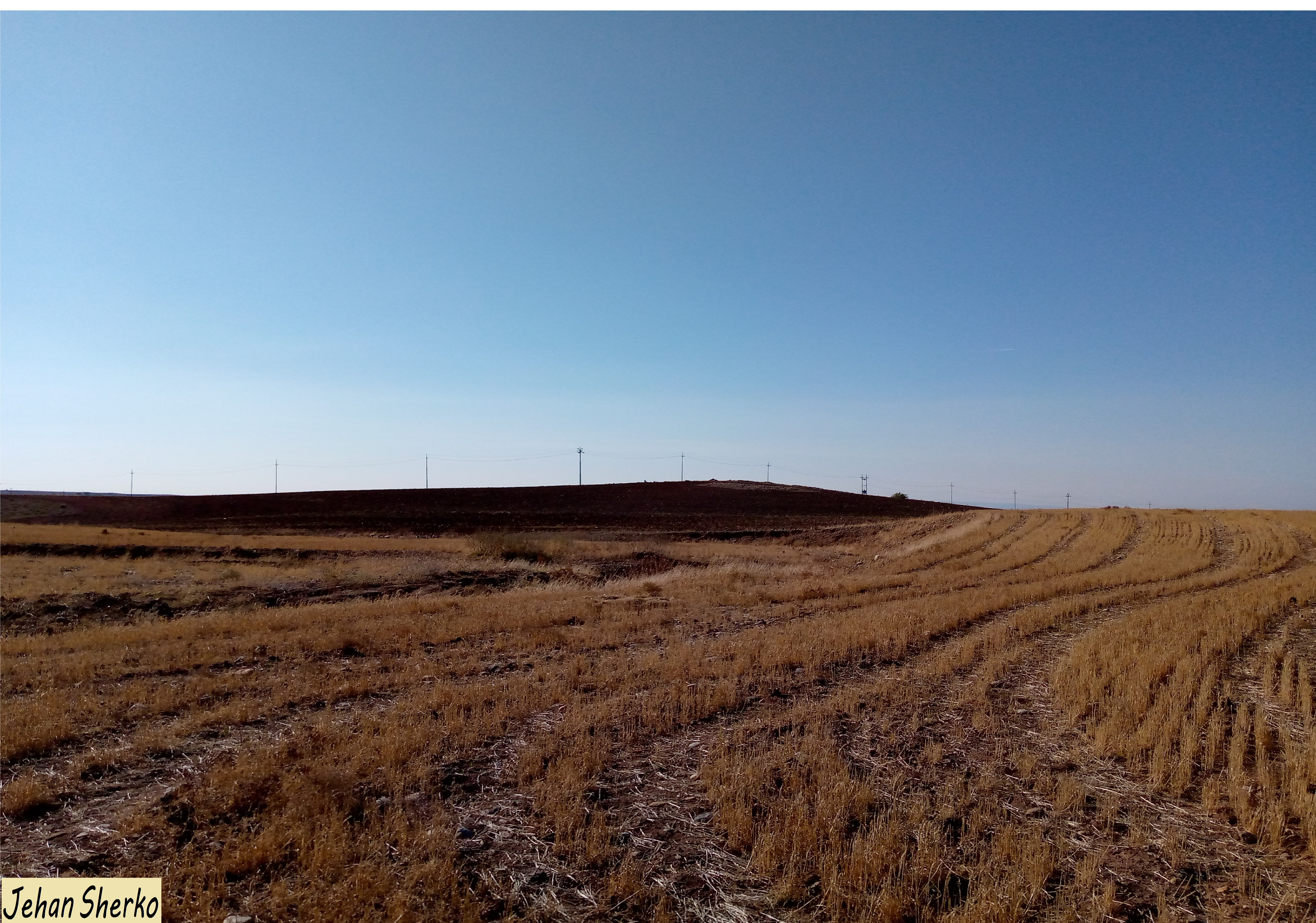
Gog - Low Mound

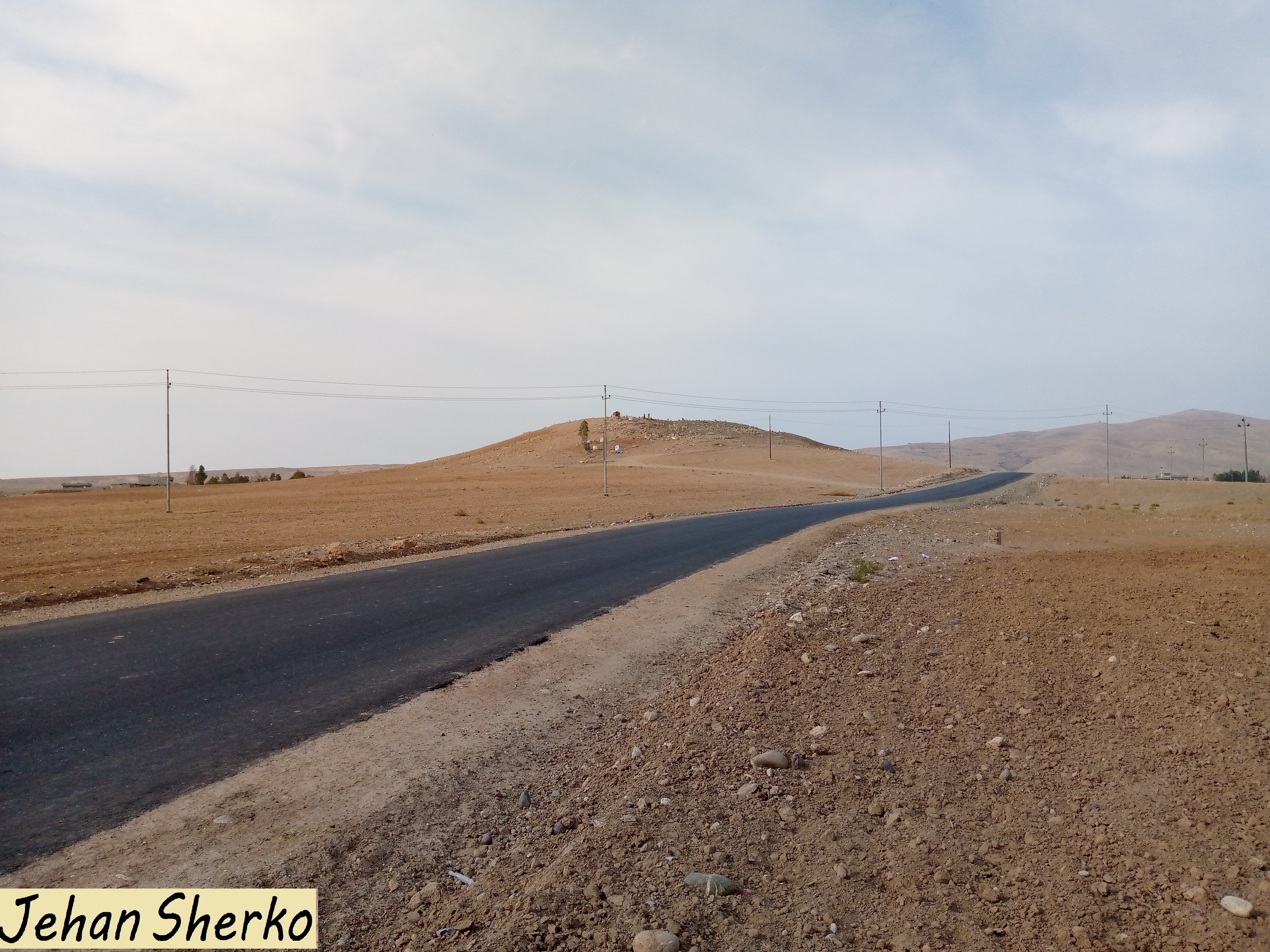
Sheena hill

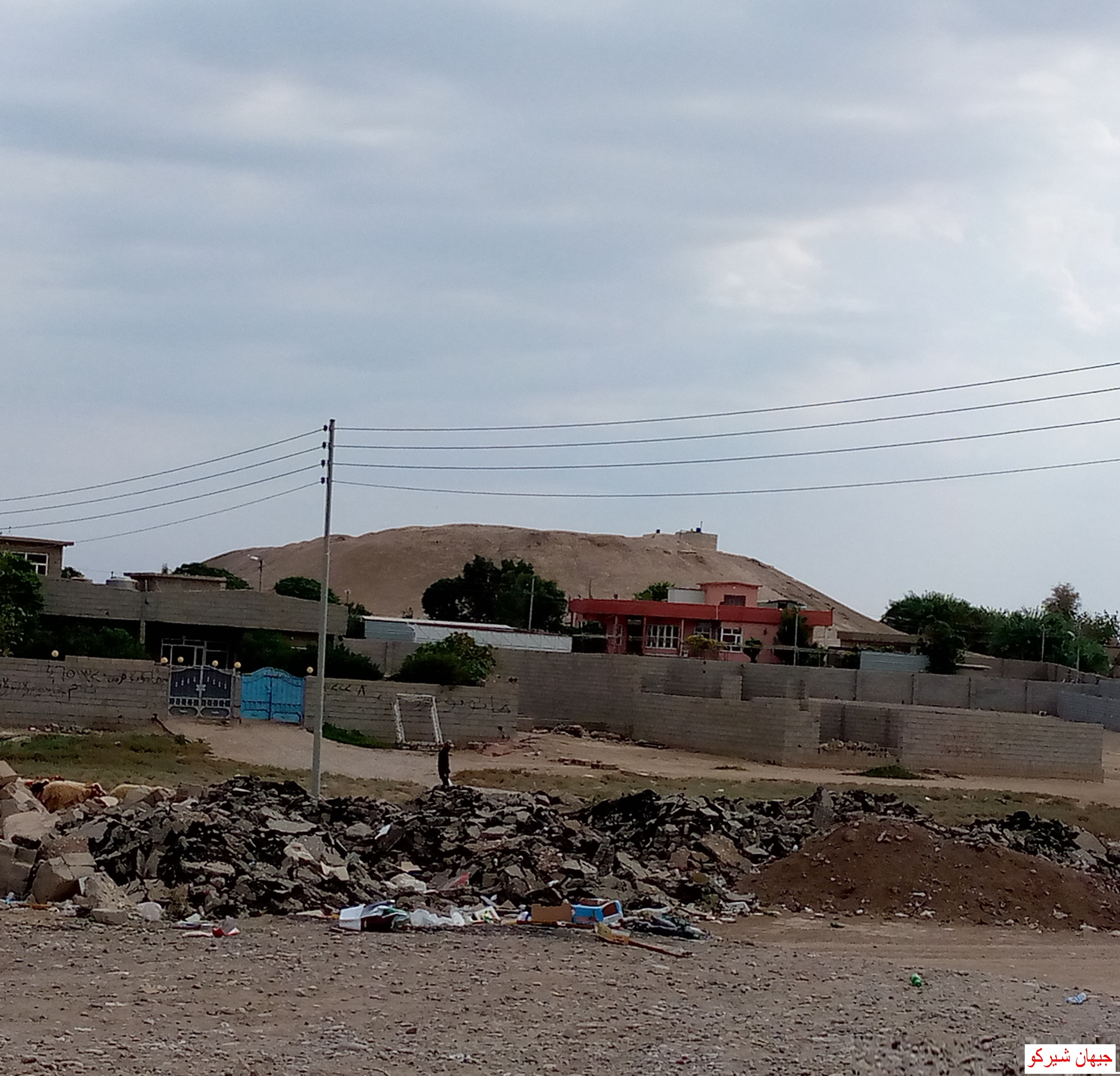
Girdi Qurshaqlu

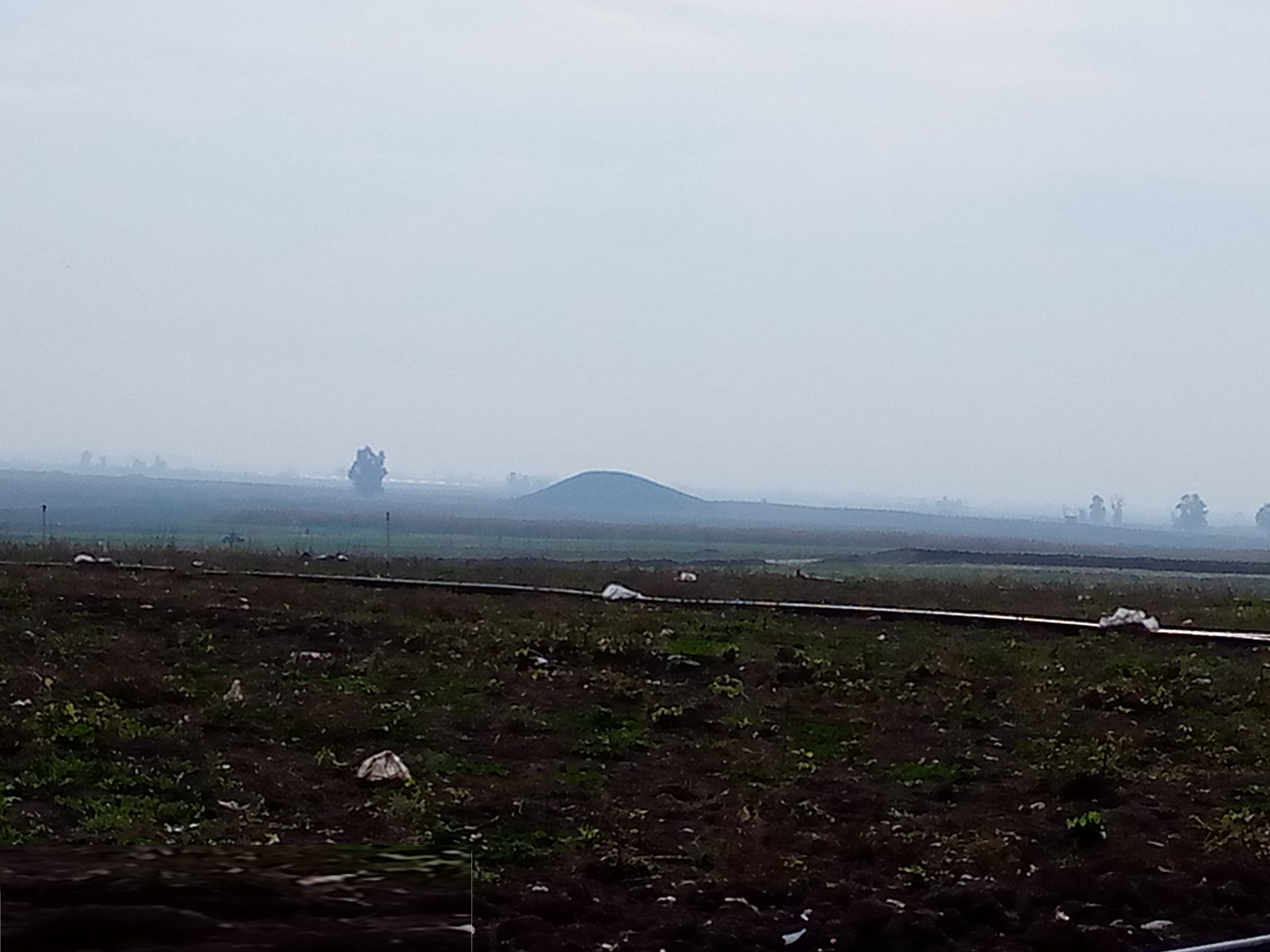
Girdi Baba Jahfar

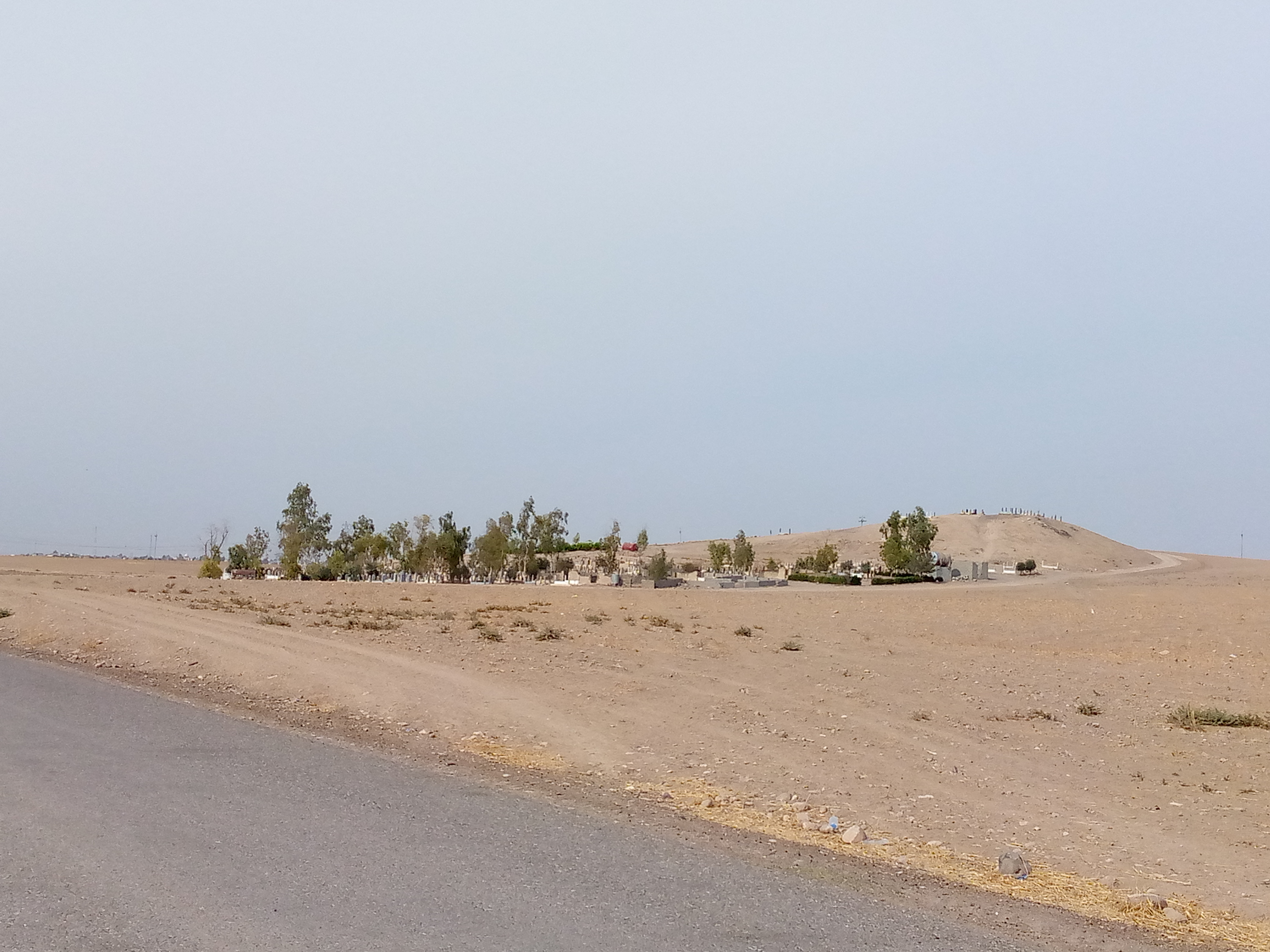
Kurd Qaburstan

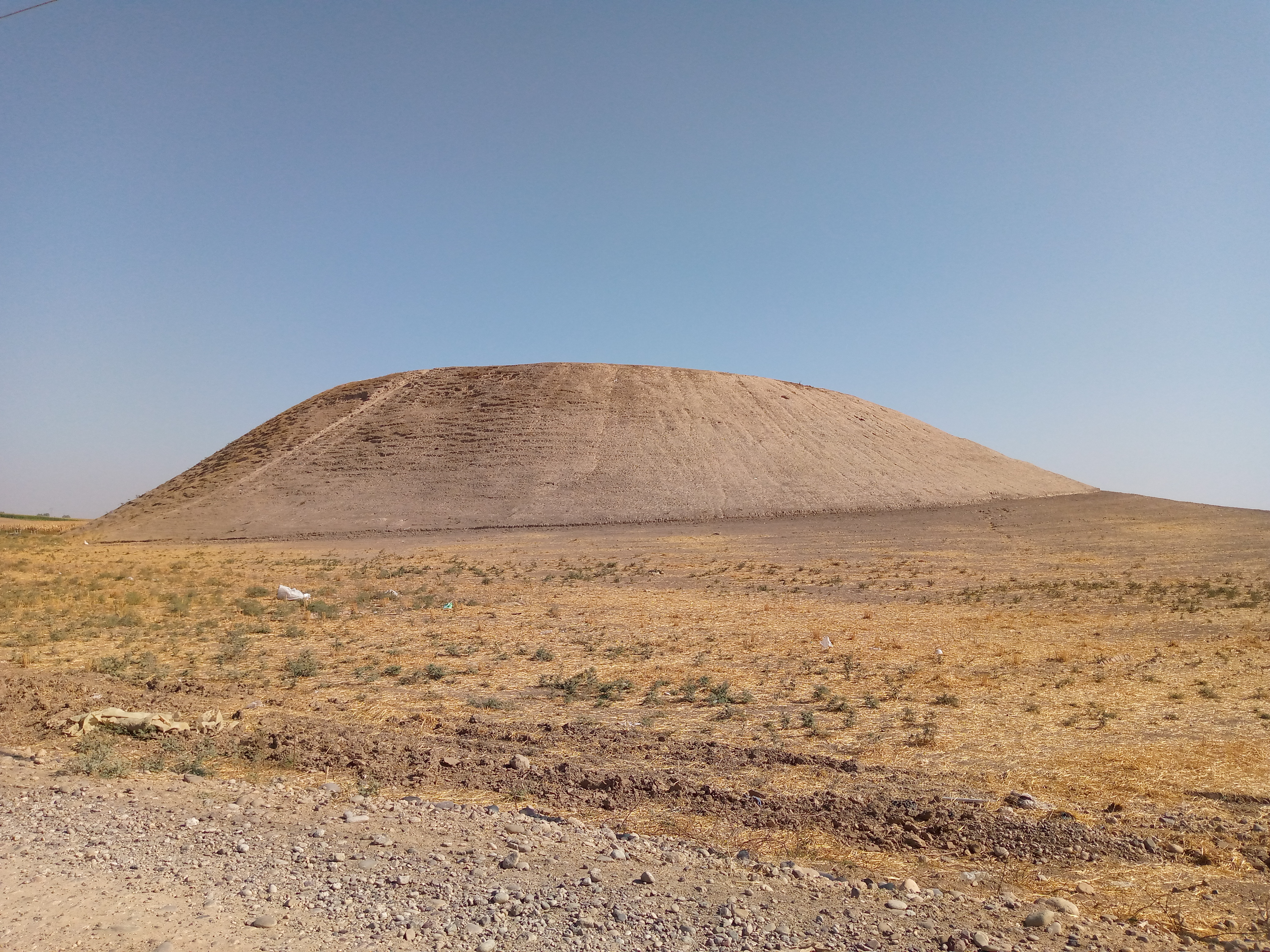
Aliawa hill

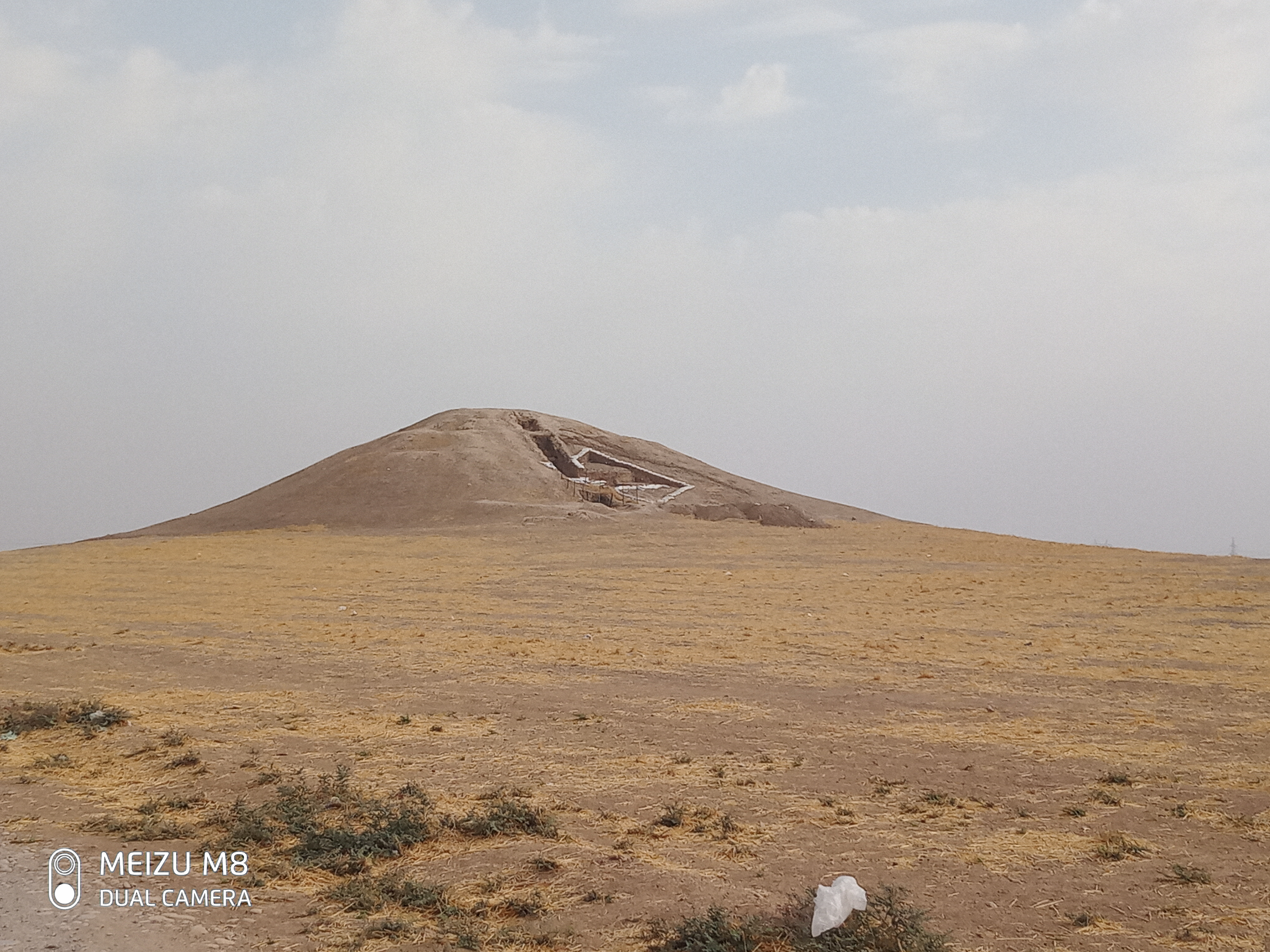
Surezha hill

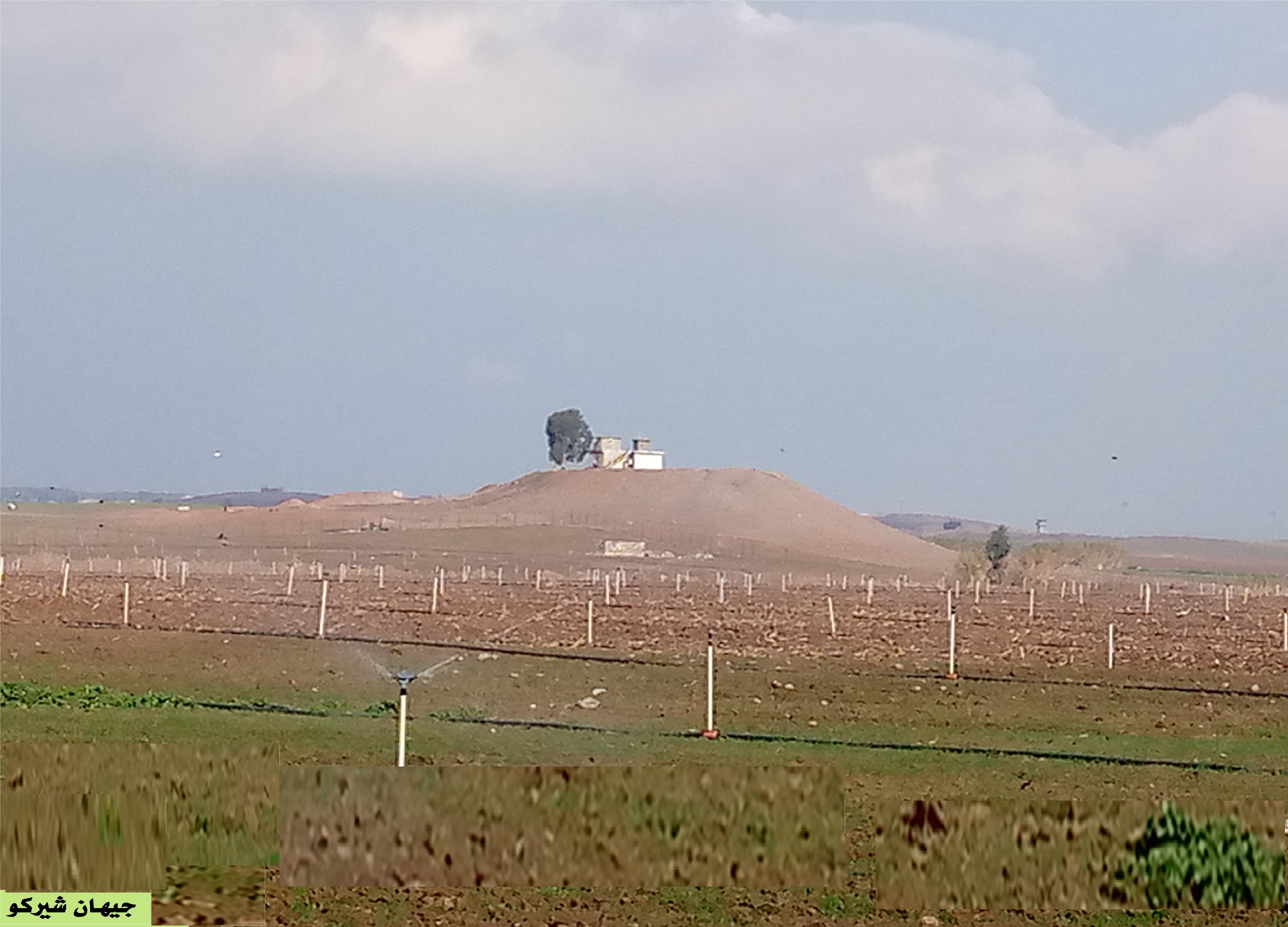
Haji Lar hill

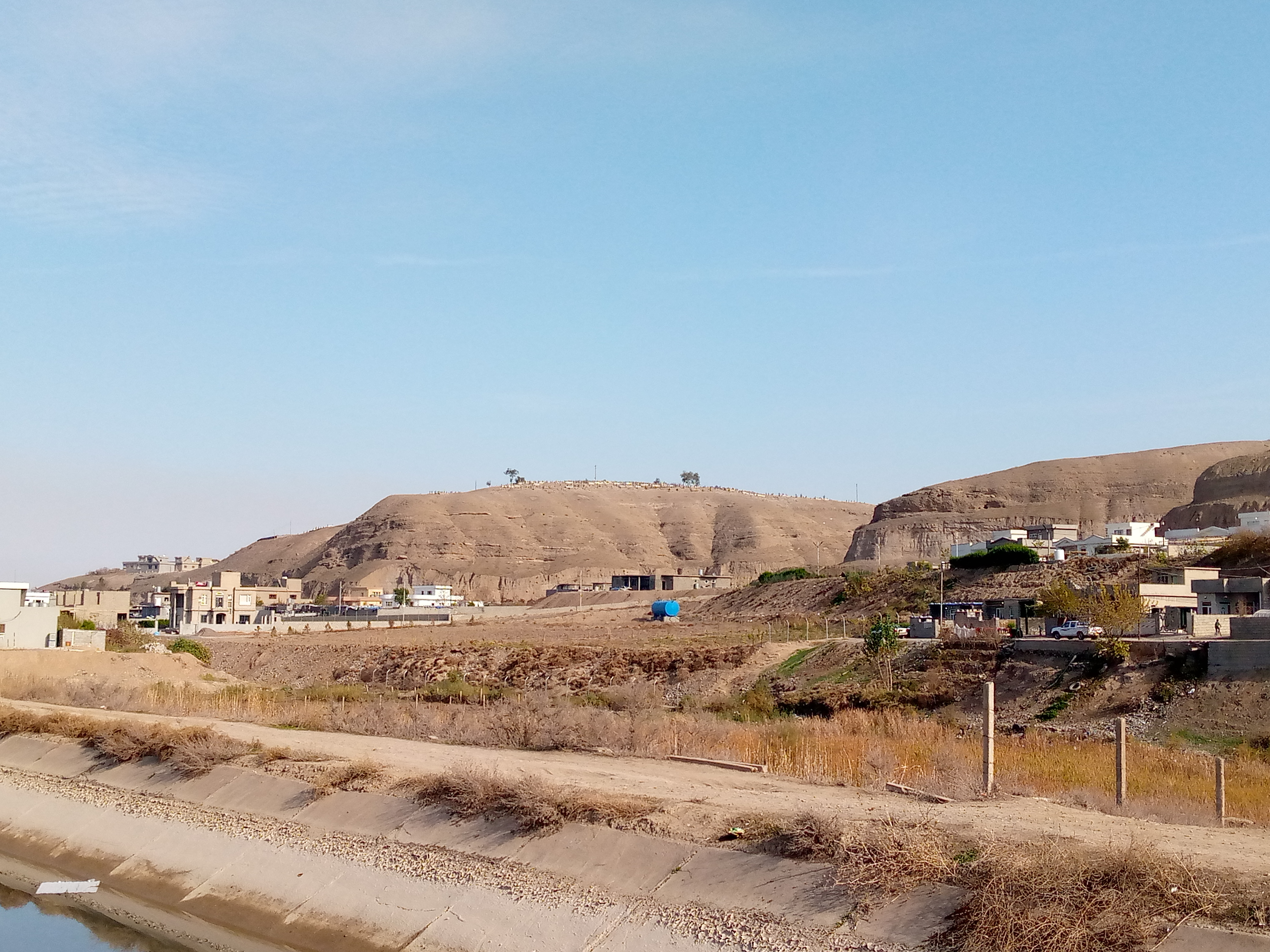
Bastam hill

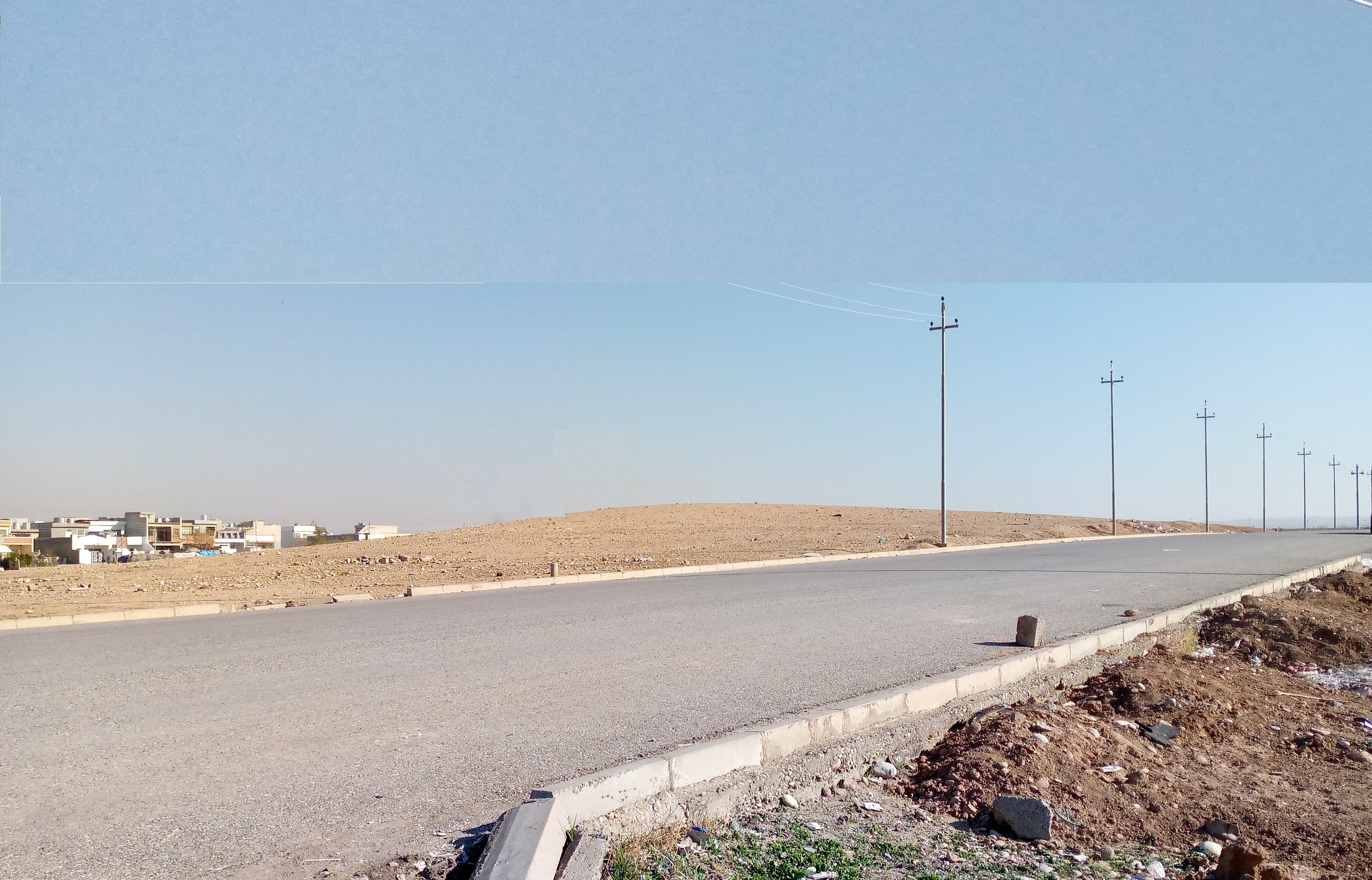
Ali Mawlan

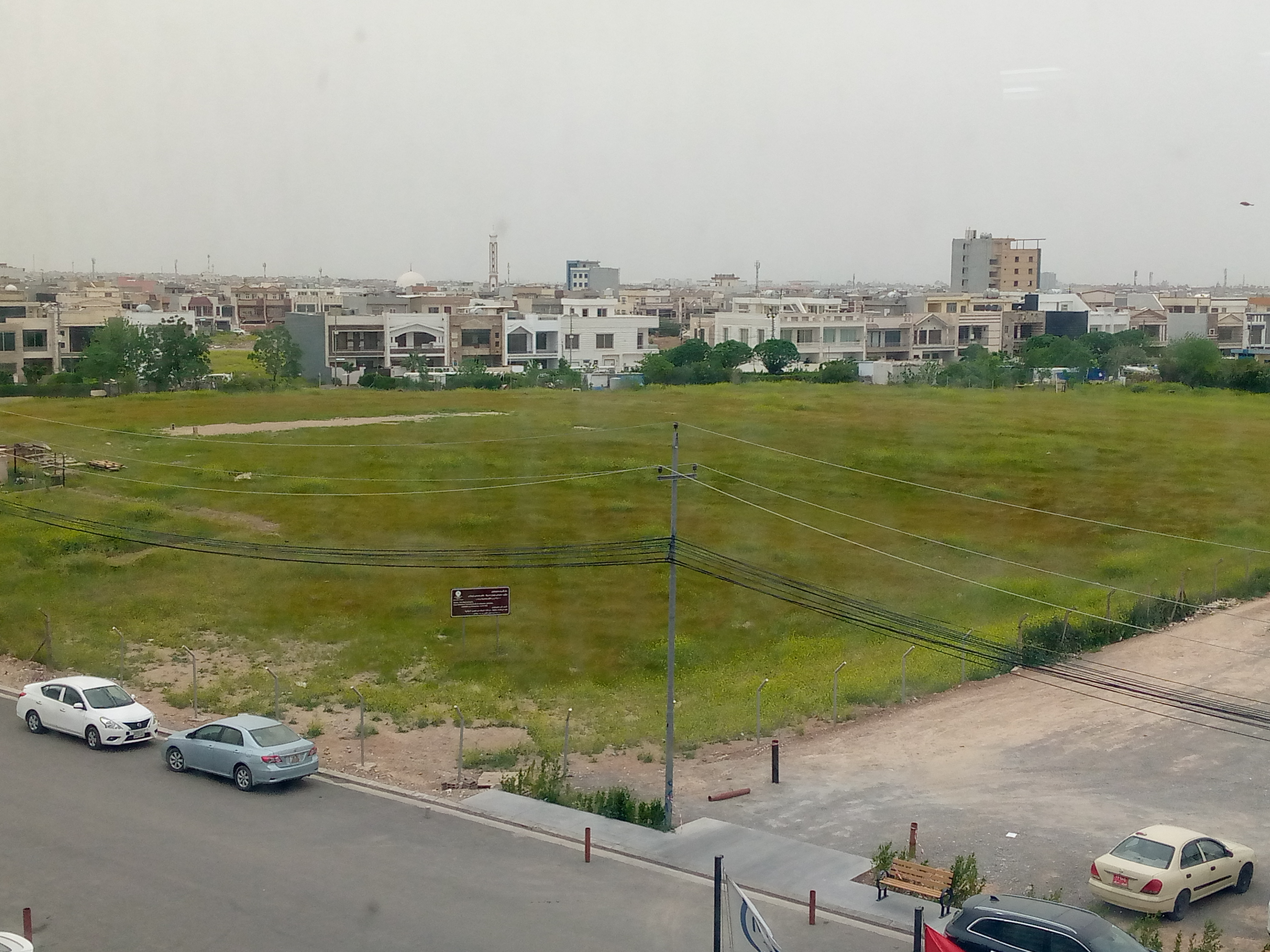
Mamustayani Nuway

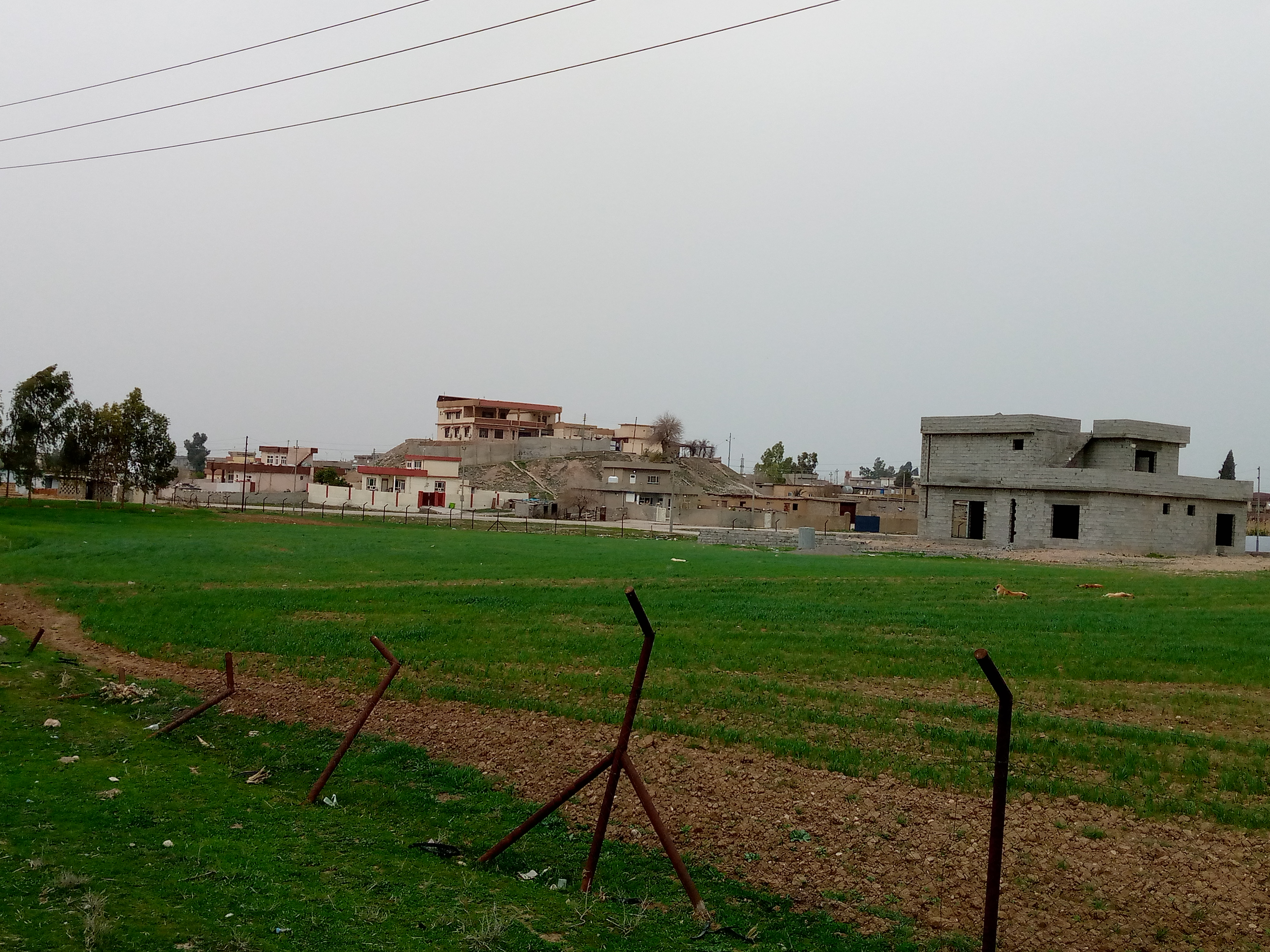
Chal hill

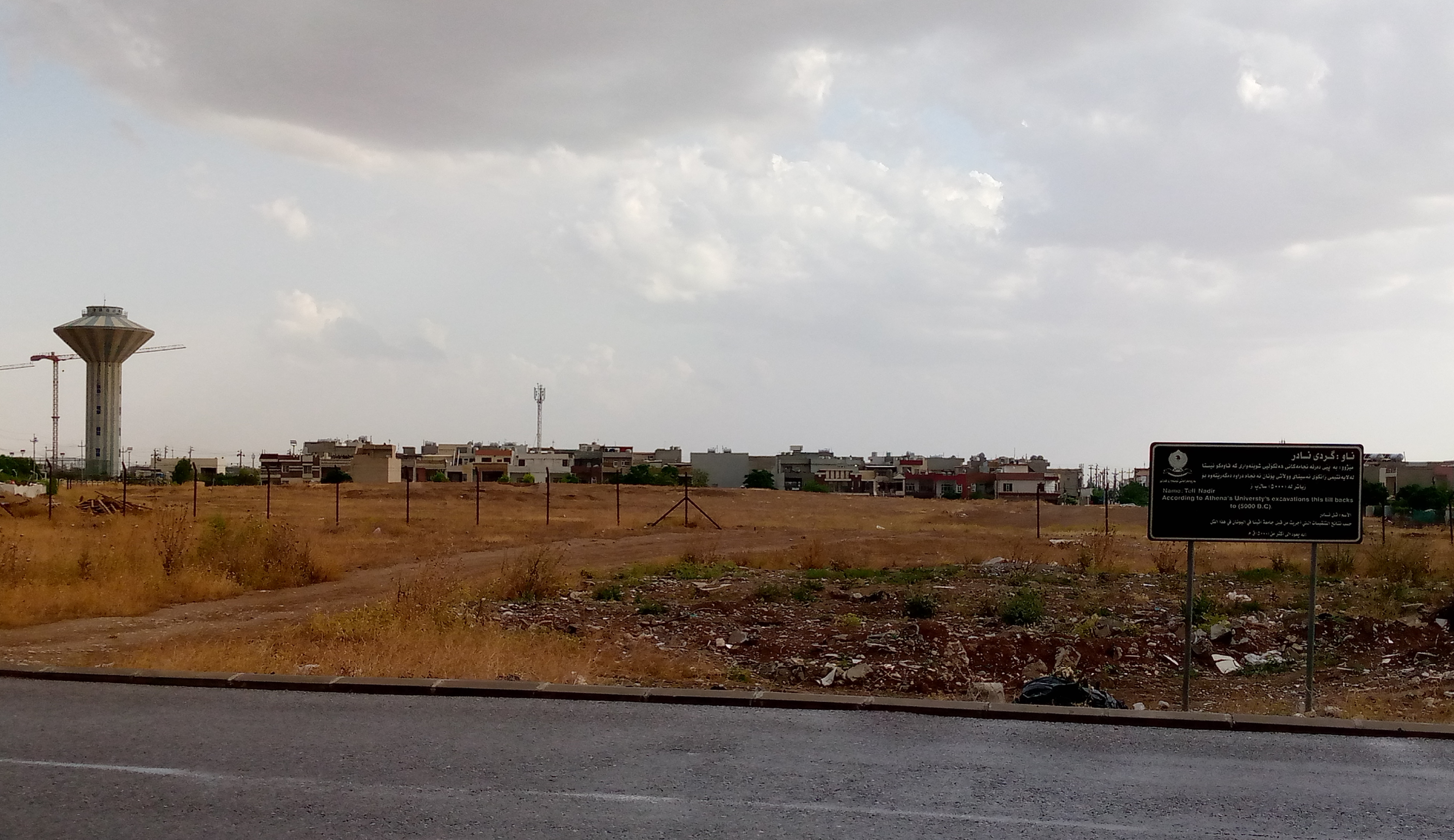
Nadir hill

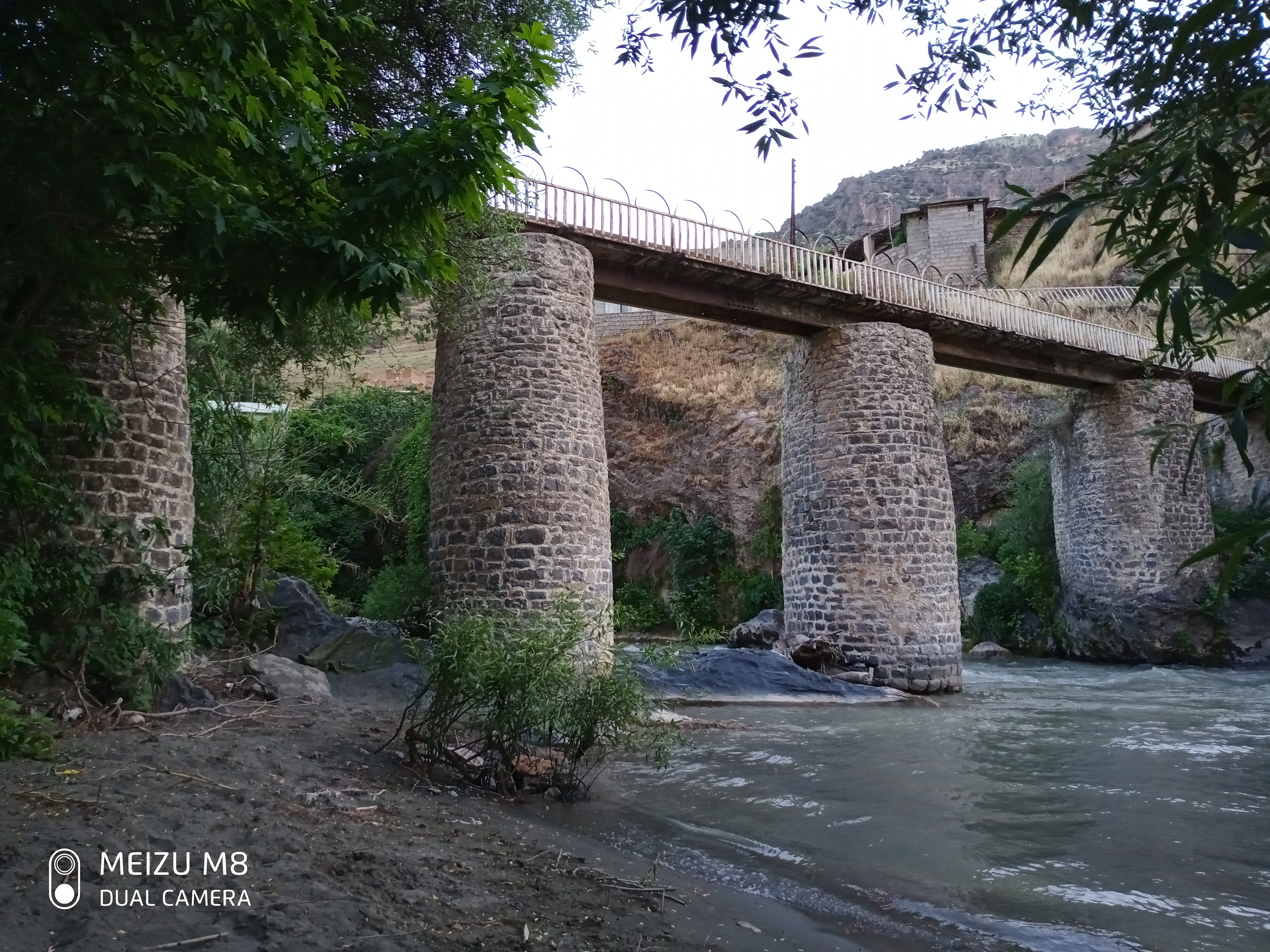
Barsireen Bridge

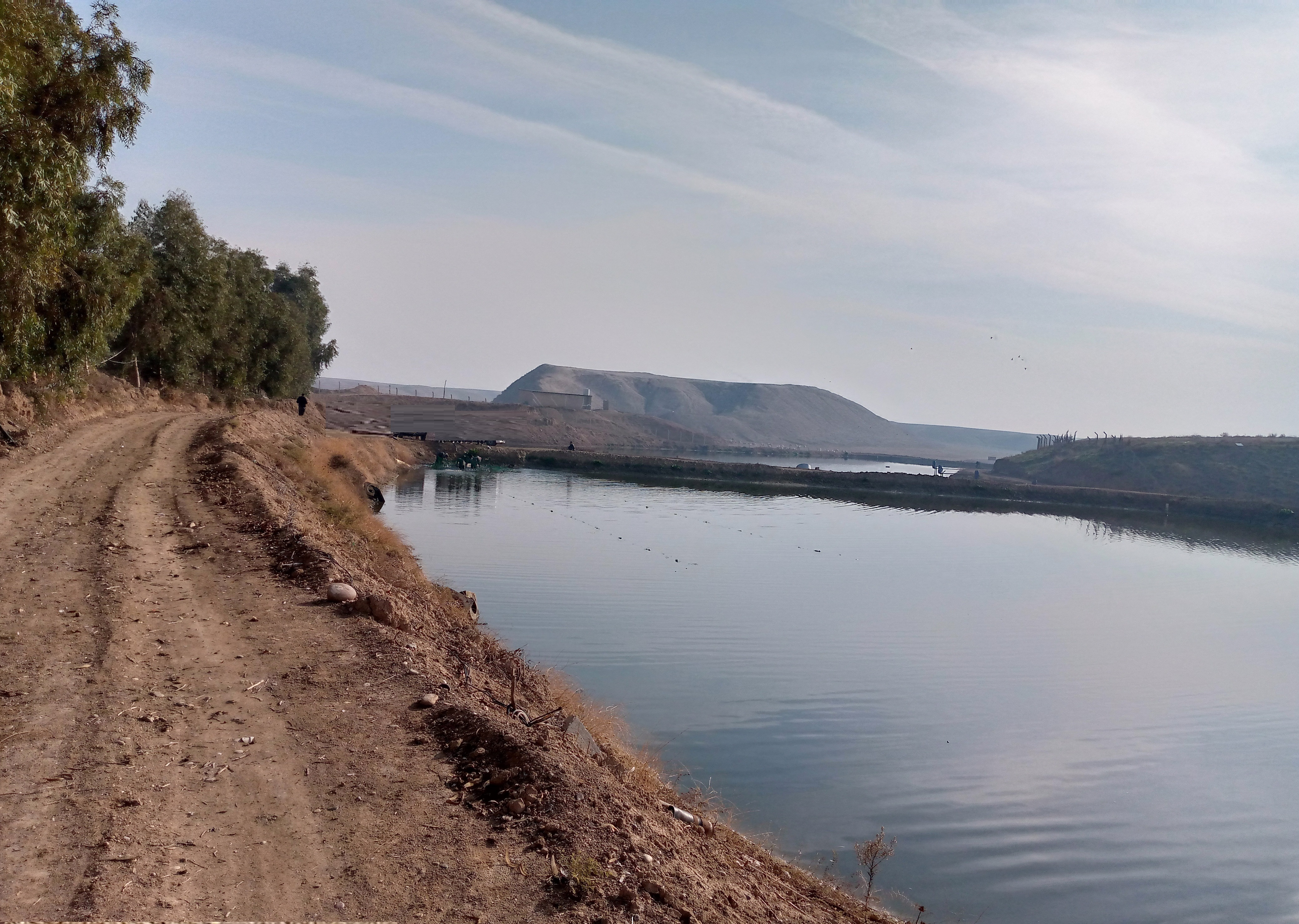
Qalat Awena

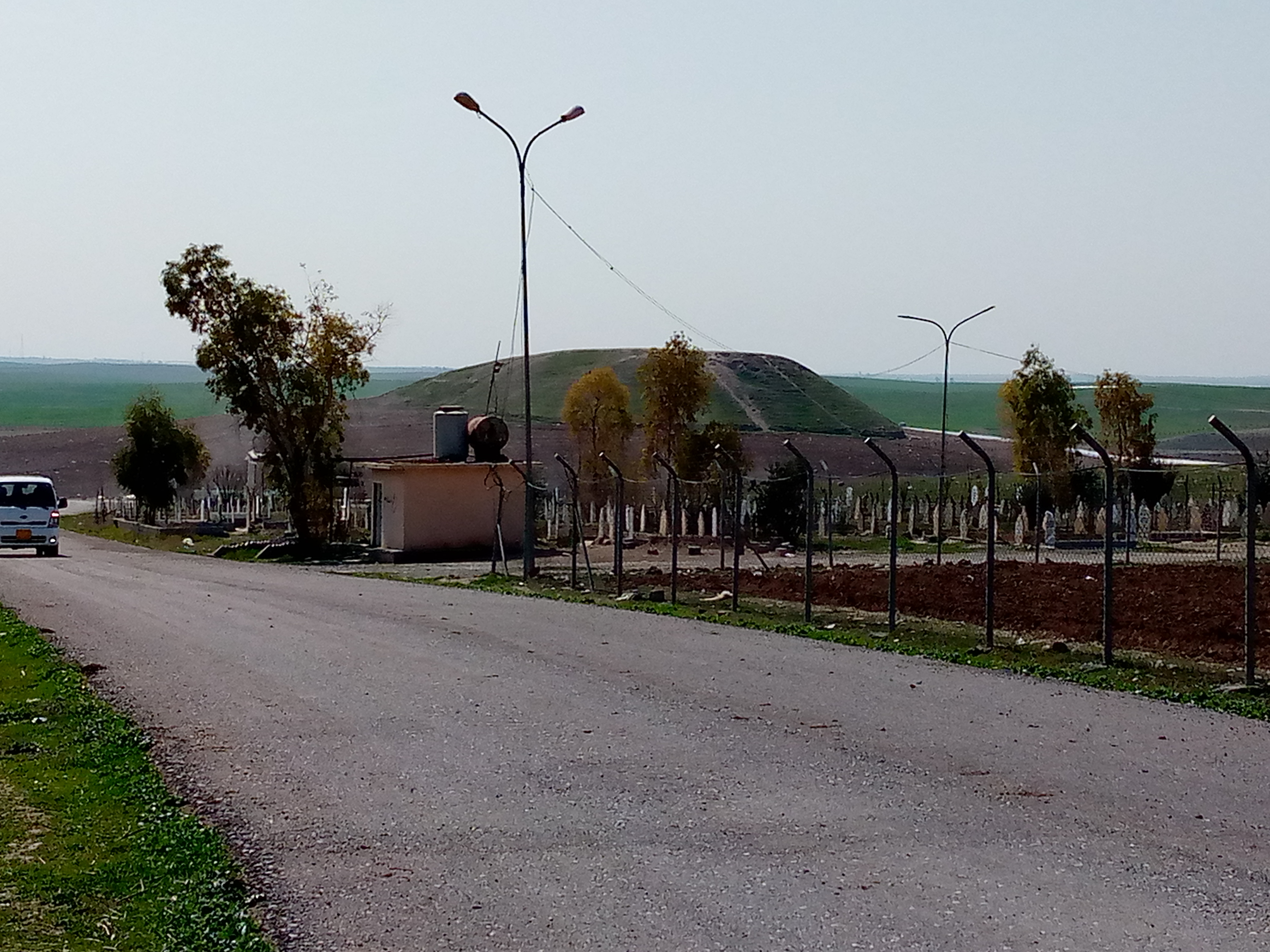
Sherawa - High Mound

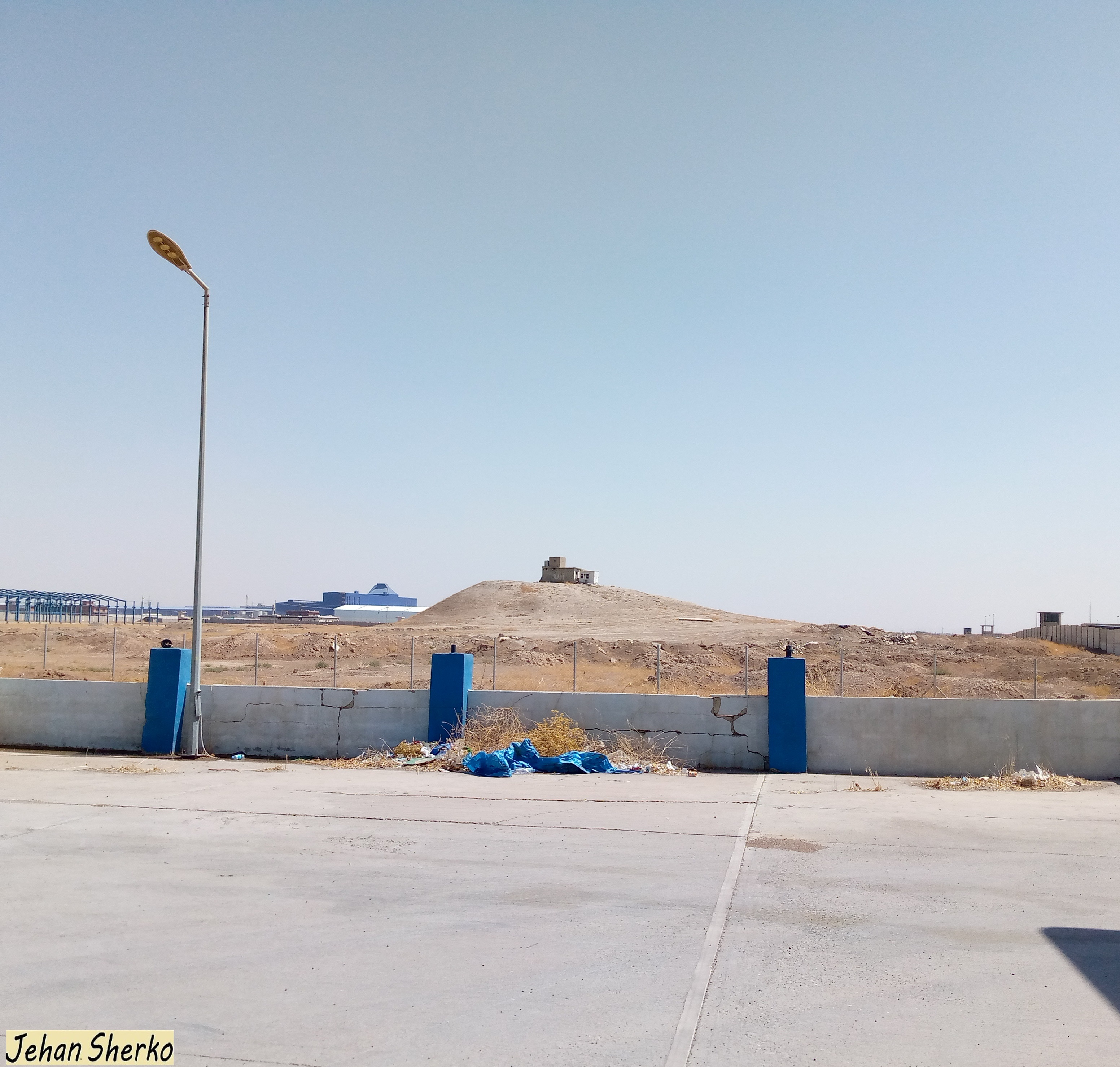
Sarawa

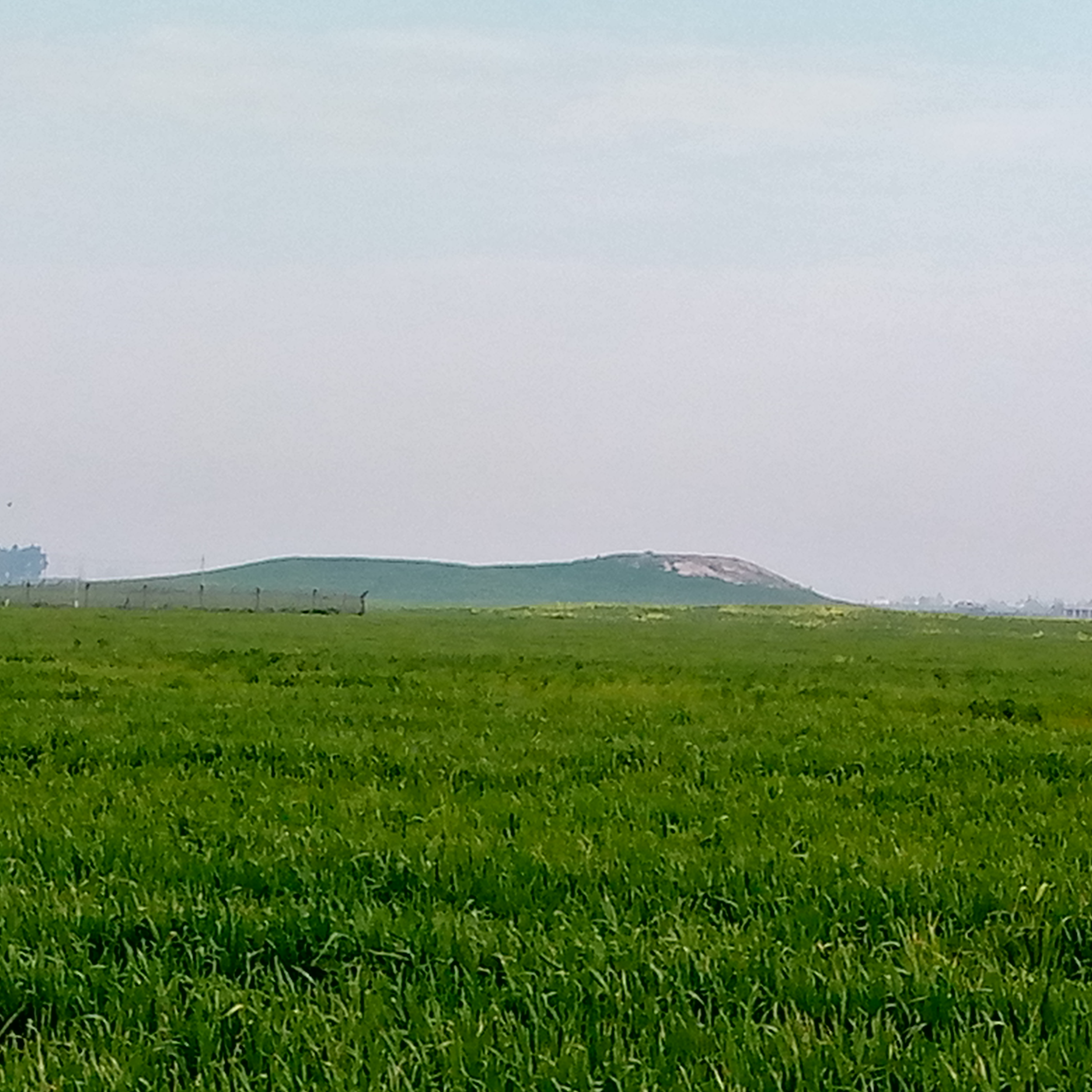
Dusara fatah

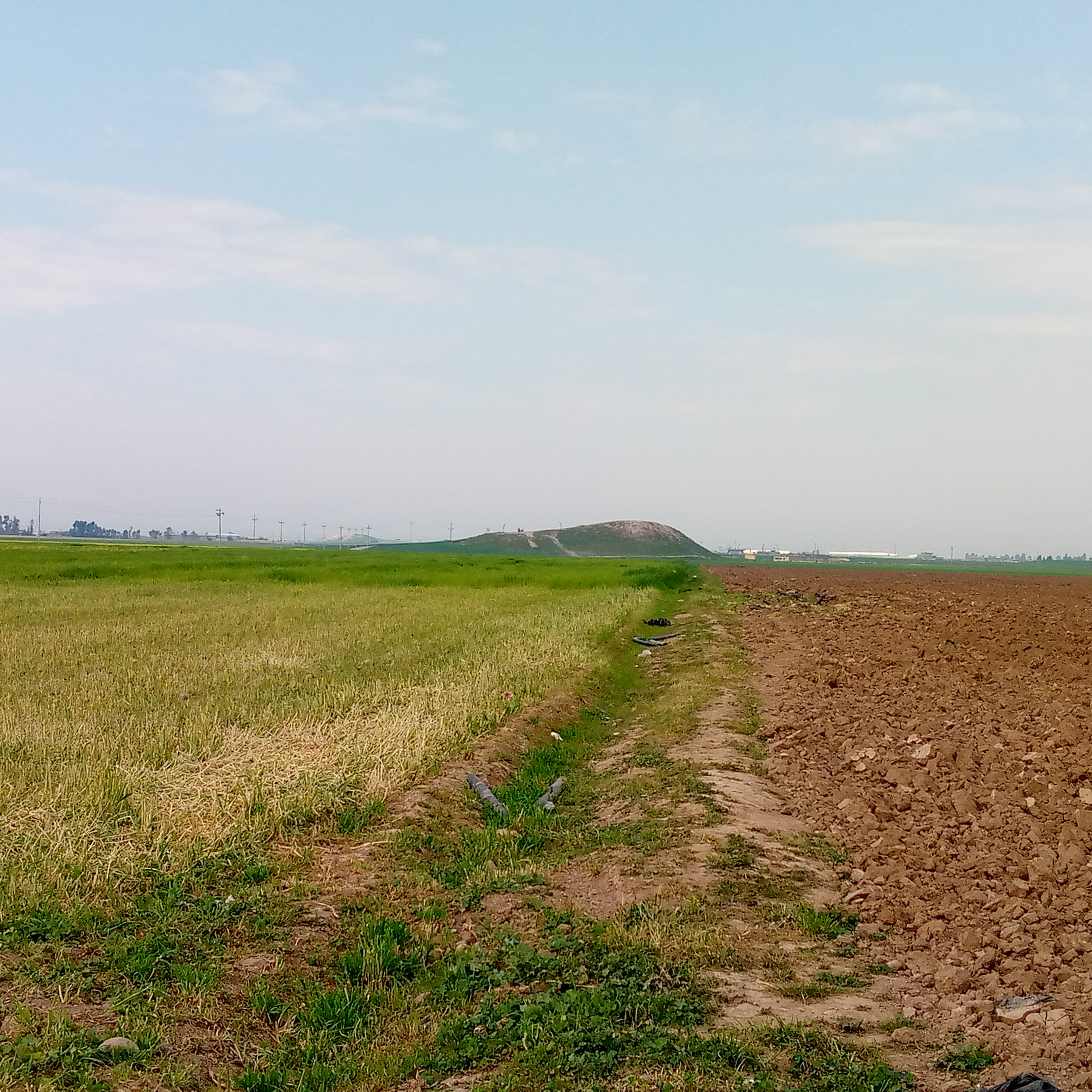
Tell sayid khidr

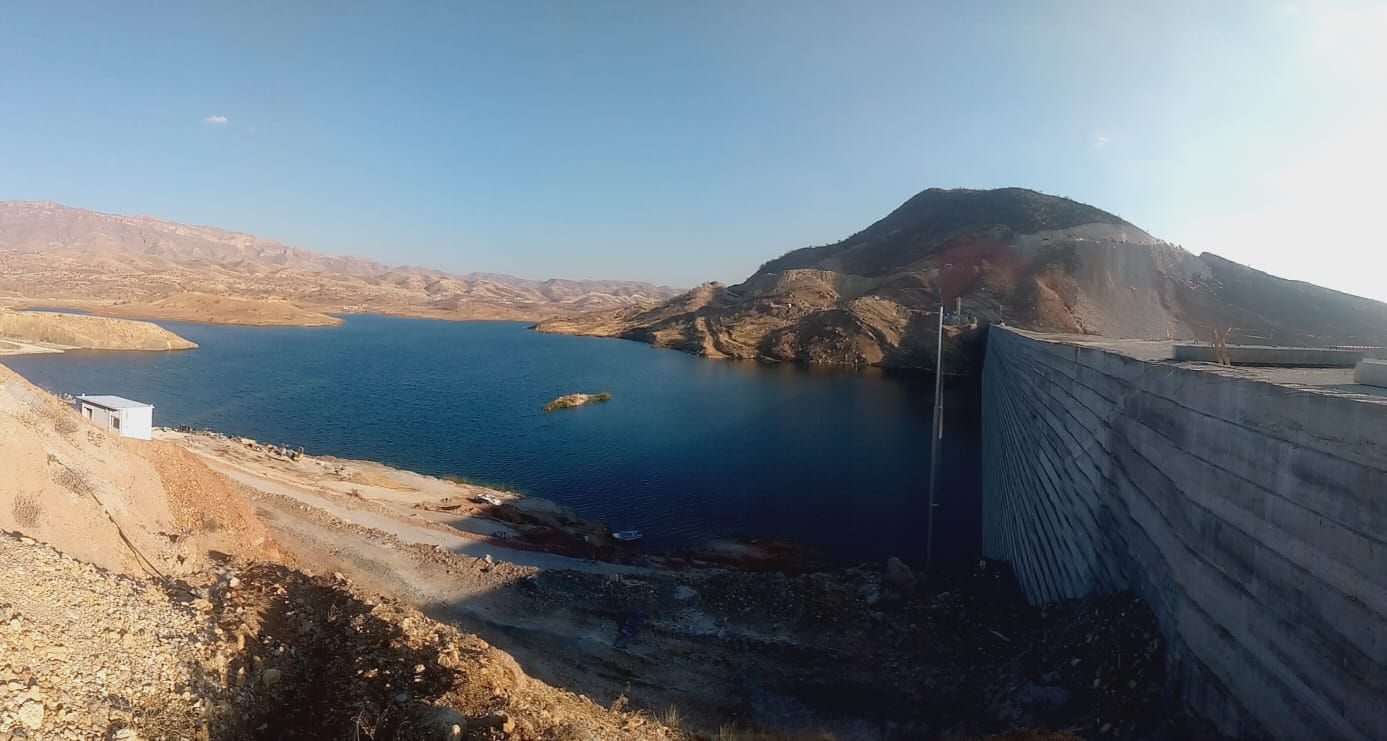
Gomaspan Dam

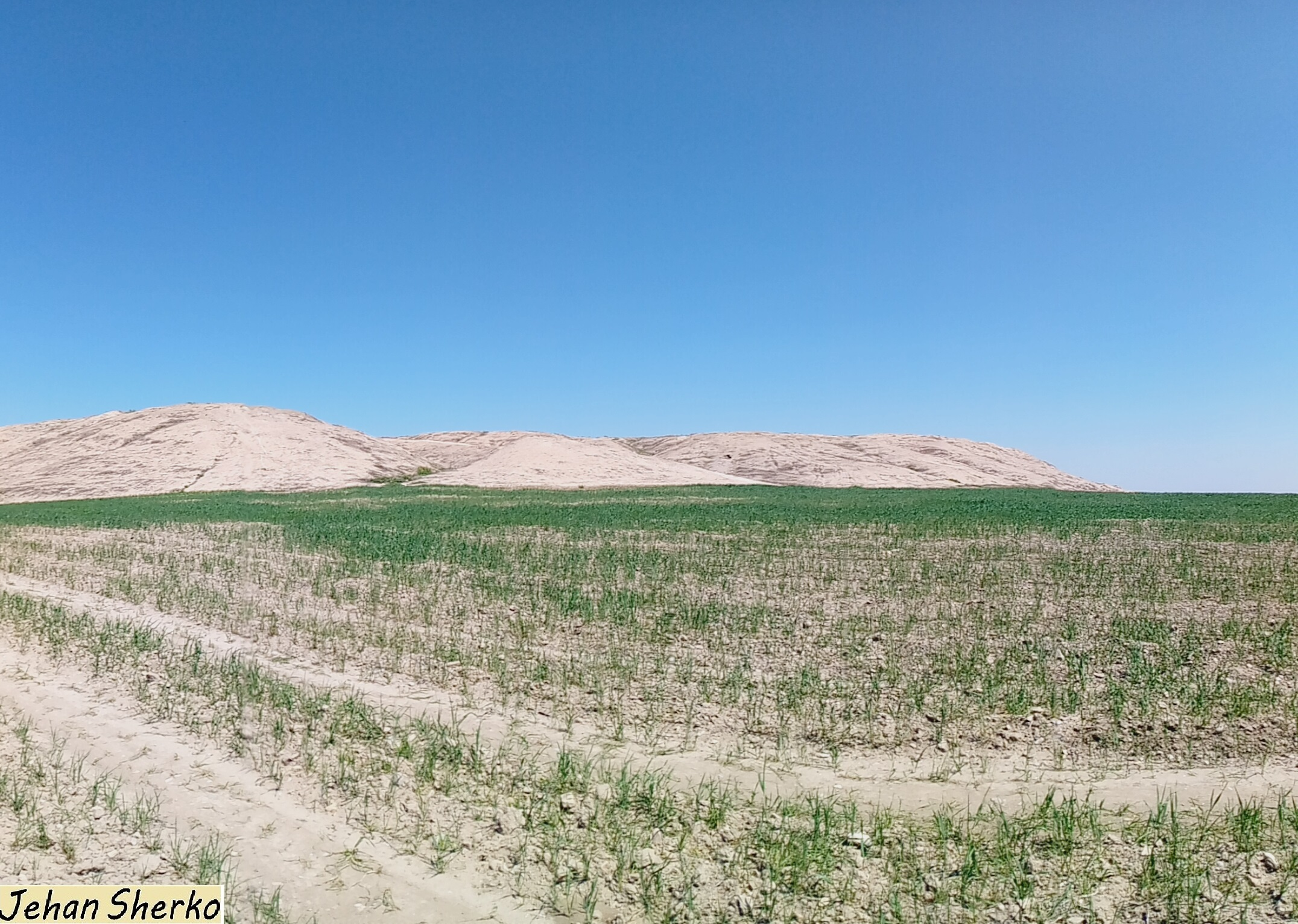
Bashtepe hill

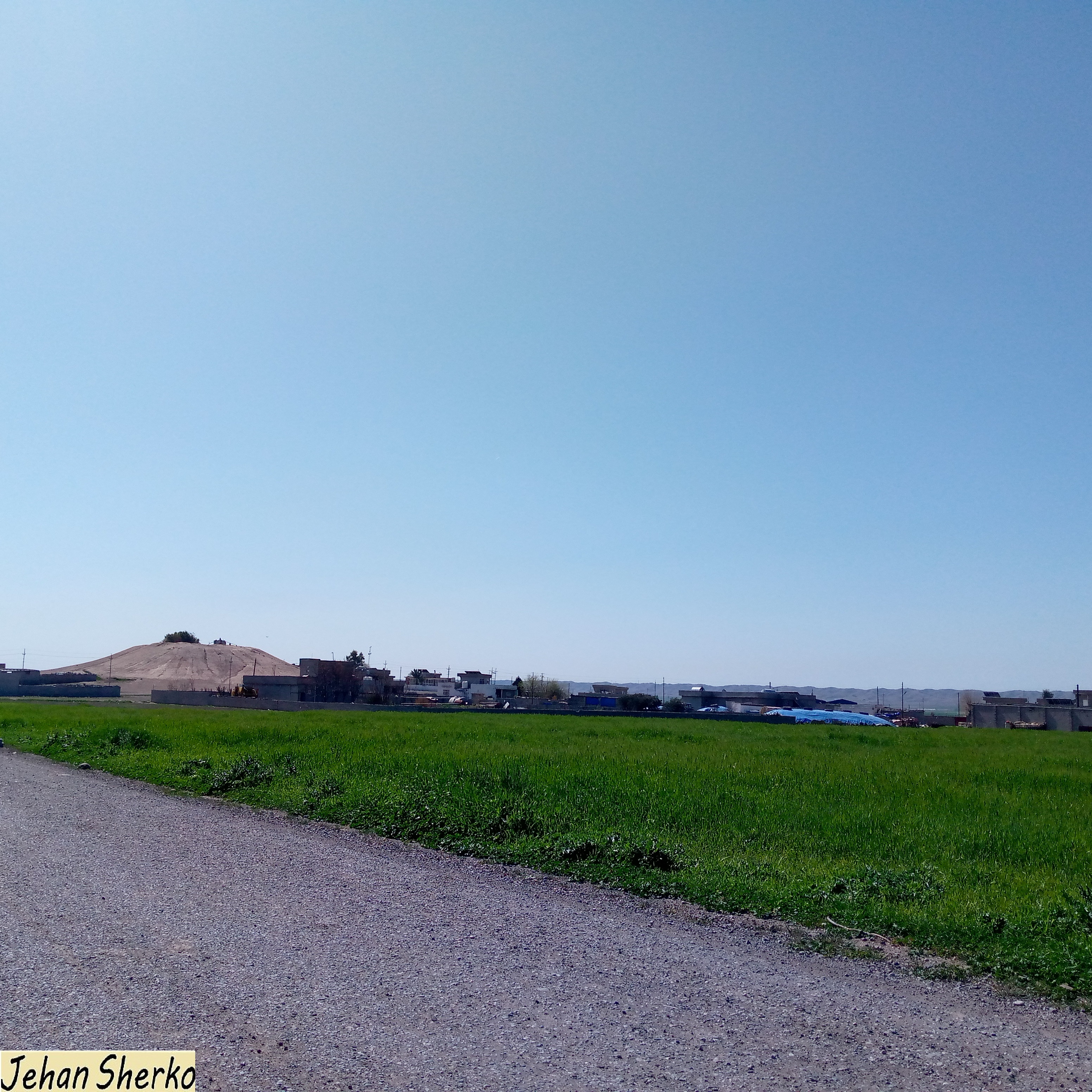
Girdi Sorbash Khidr

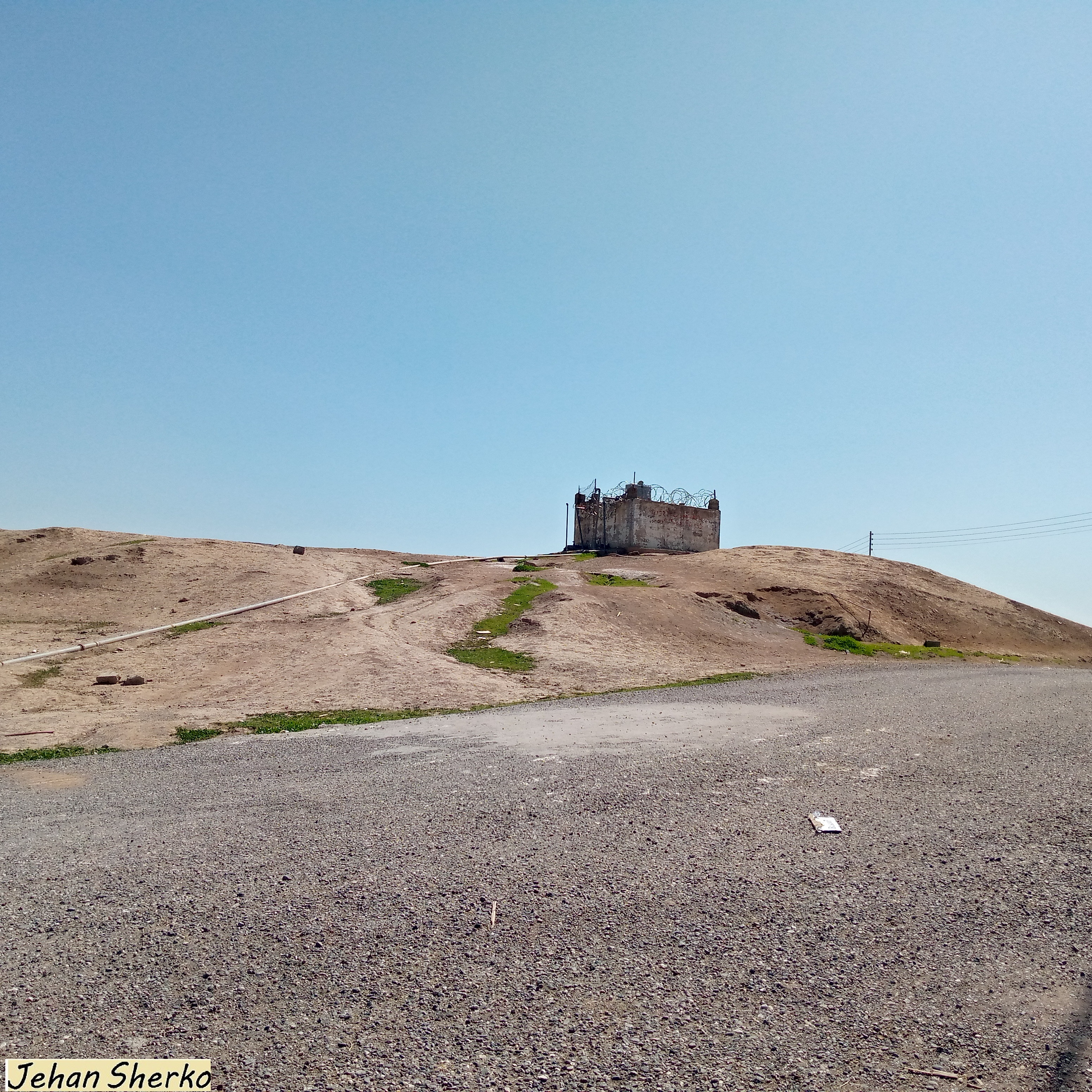
Ghazikhana hill

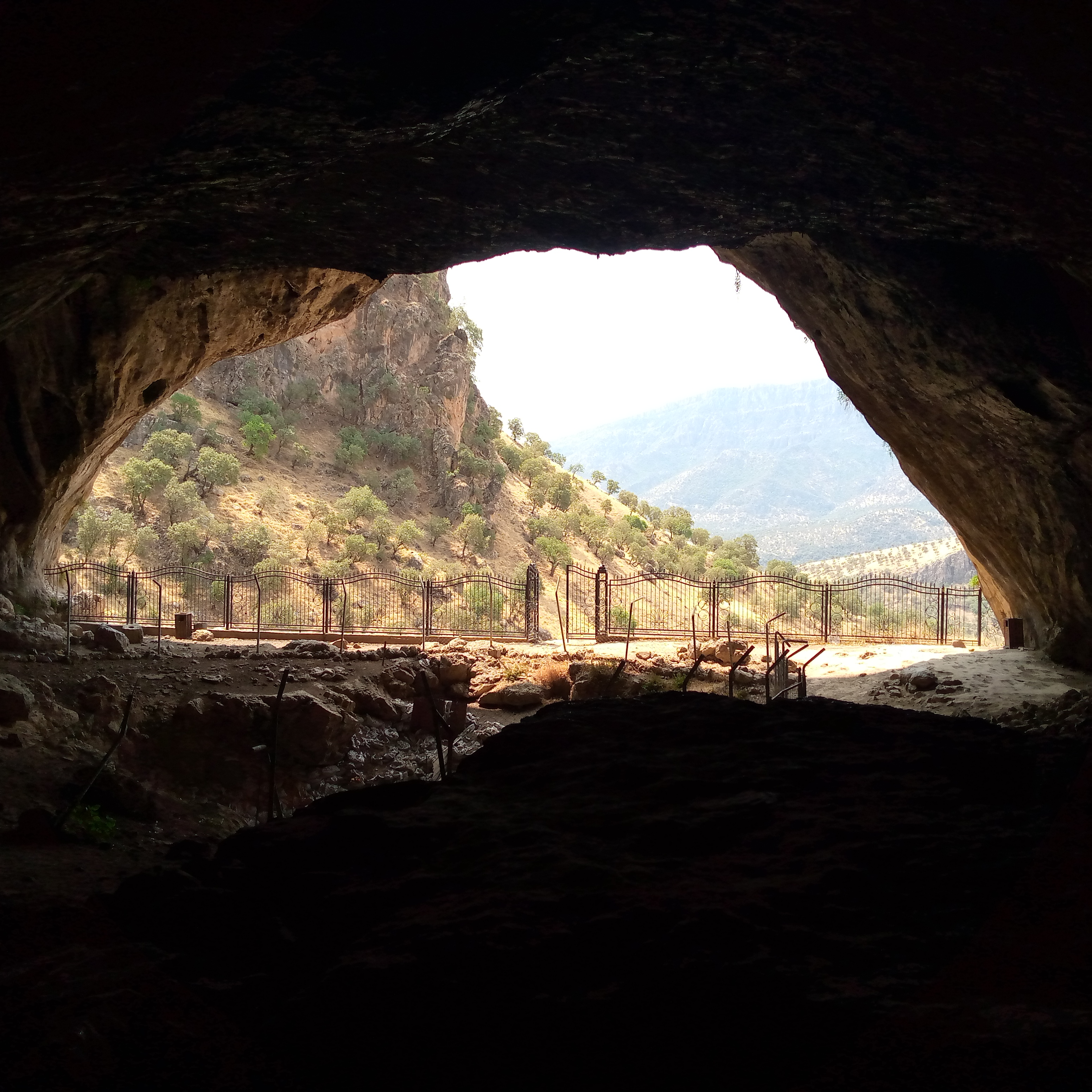
Shanidar Cave

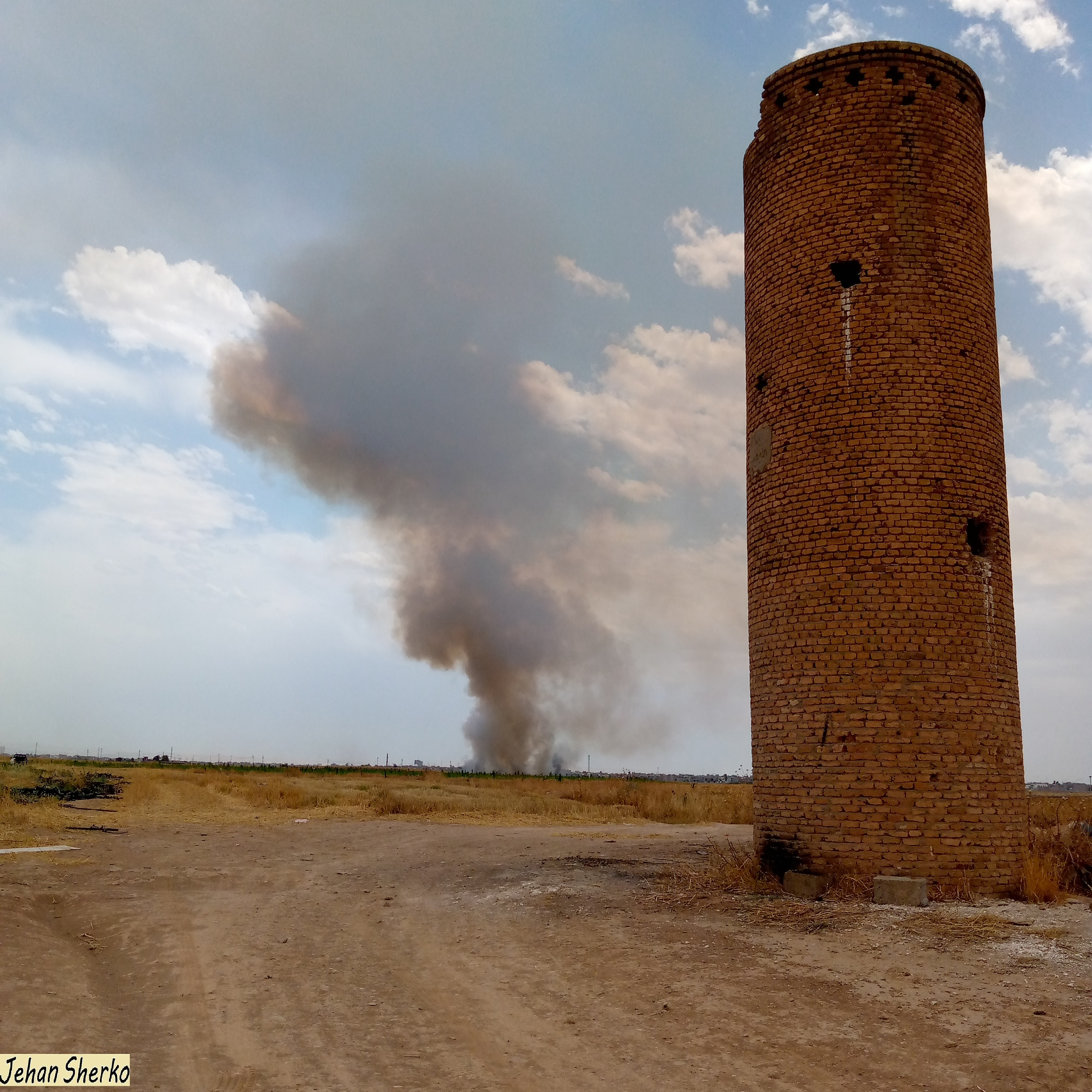
Azza village mill in Erbil

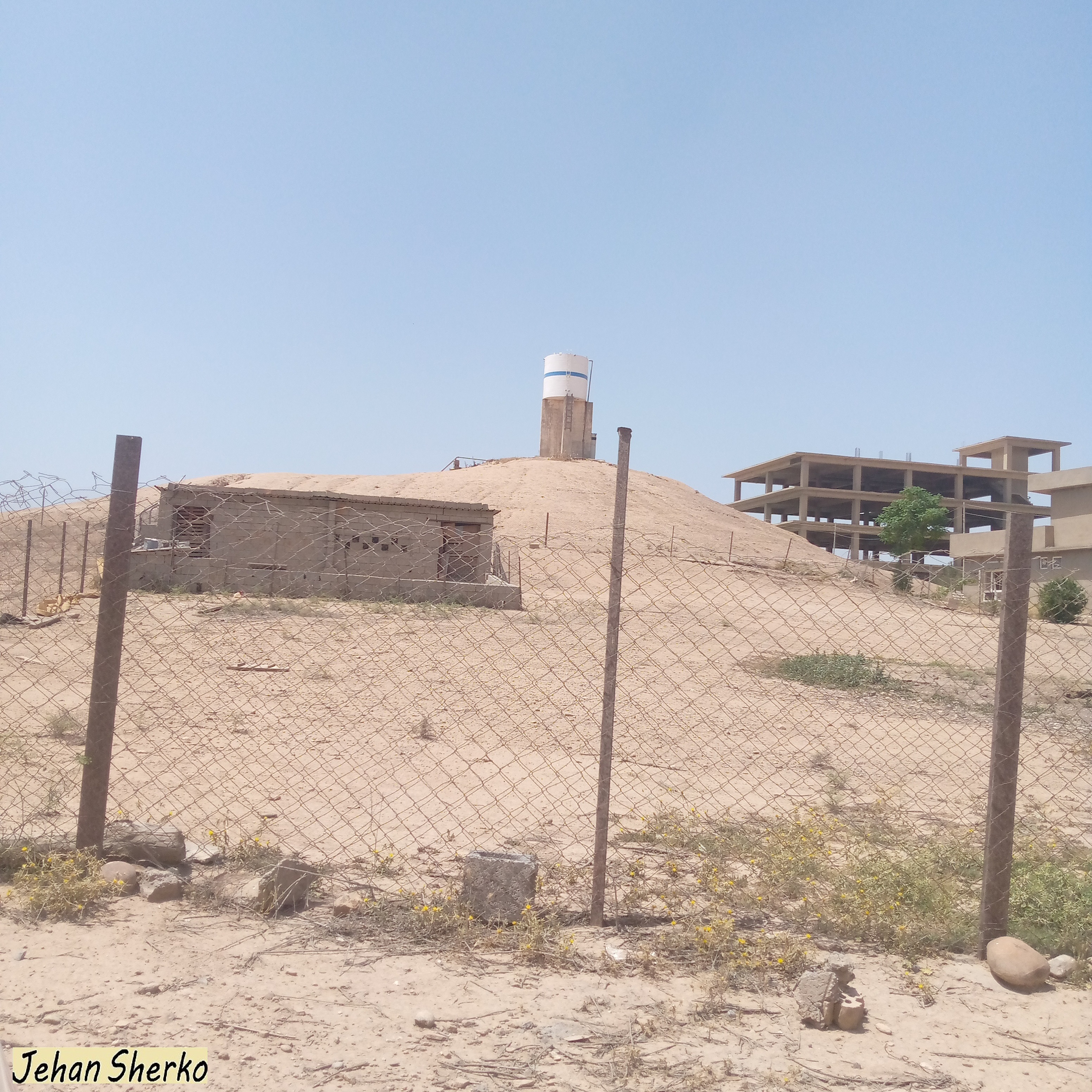
Dolaza hill

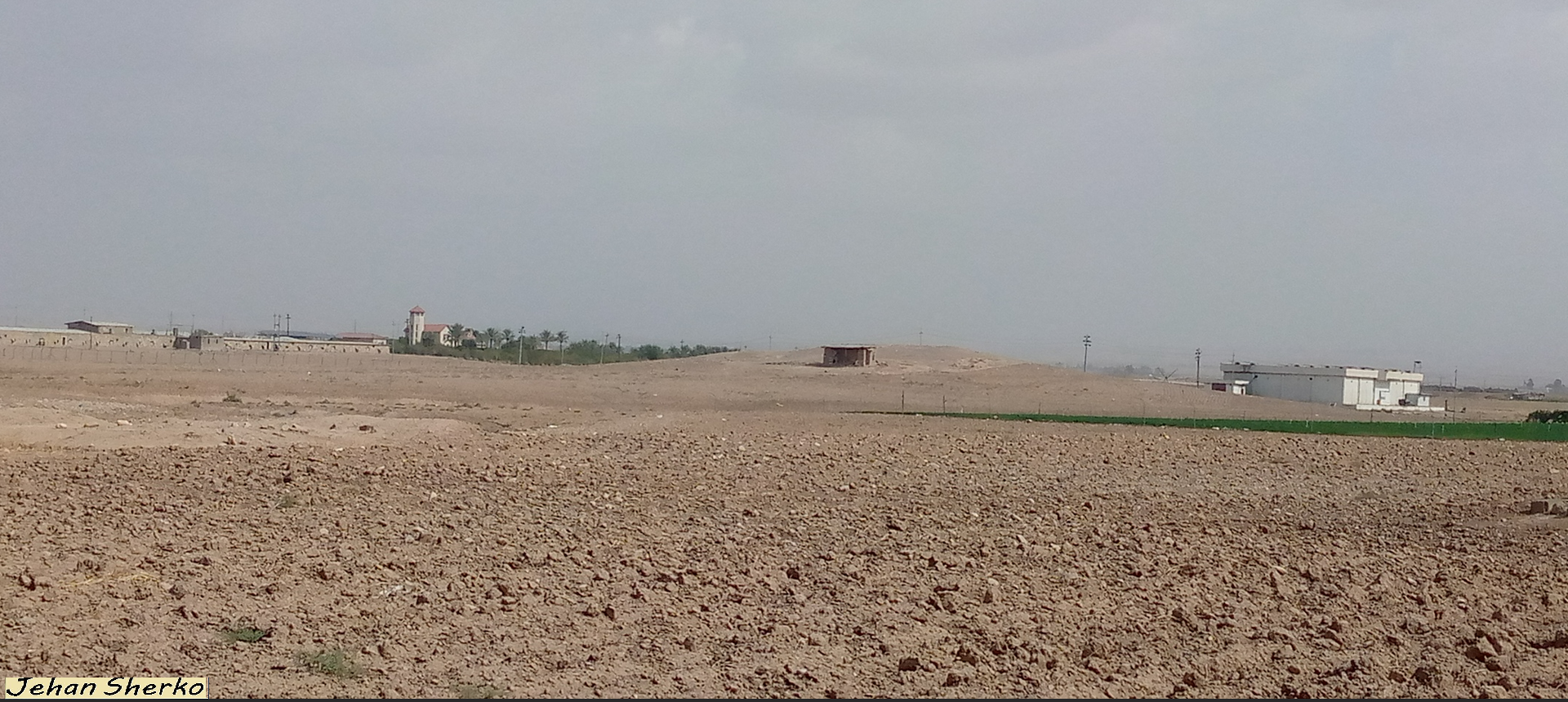
Gird Mala

== See also ==
- Erbil
- Kurd Qaburstan
- Qasr Shemamok
