= Ur-Pabilsag =

Ur-Pabilsag 𒌨𒀭𒉺𒉋𒊕

King of Ur
- Reign: c. 2550 BC
- Died: c. 2550 BC

Location of Ur

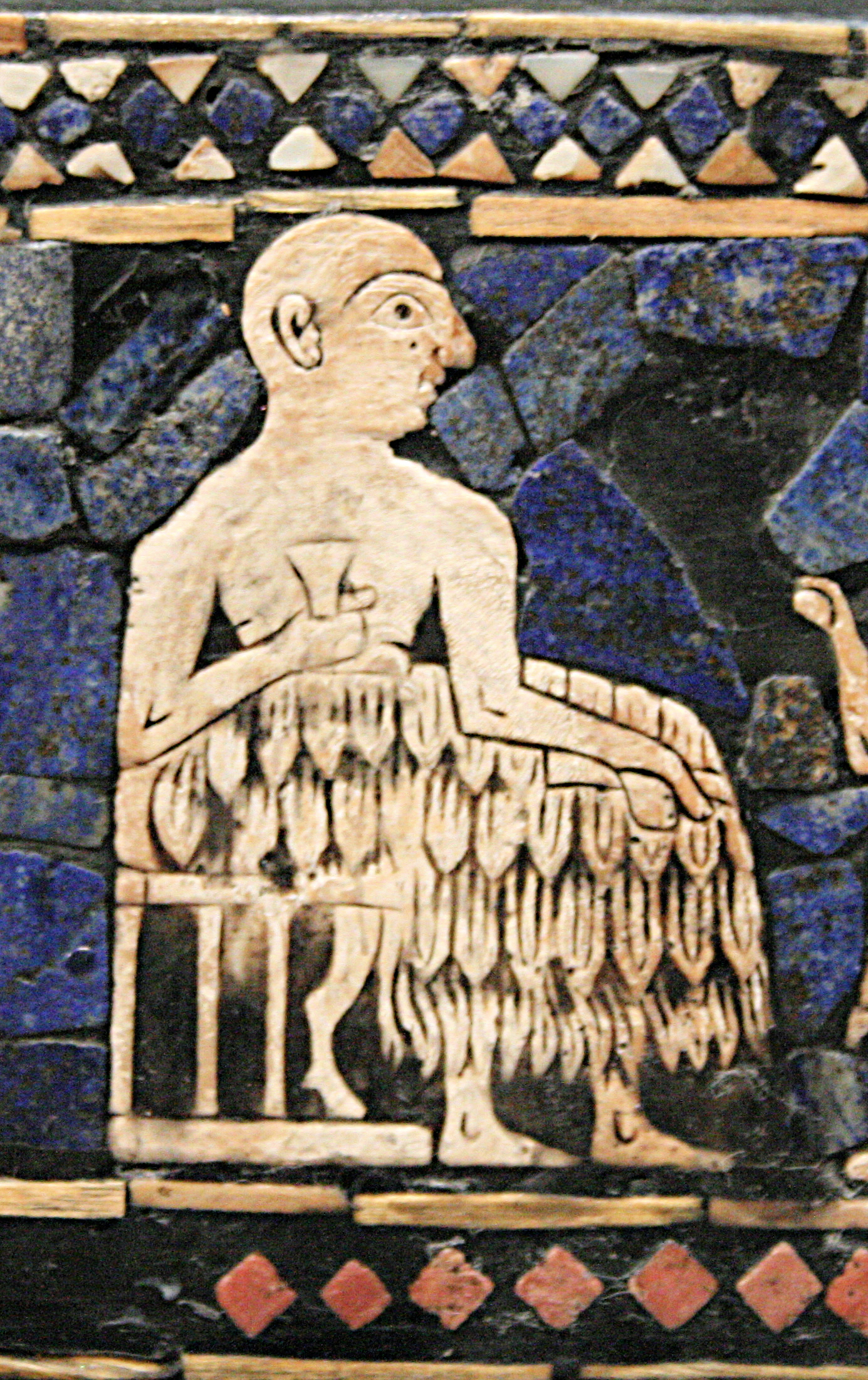
Enthroned King of Ur, on the Standard of Ur, found in grave PG 779, possibly belonging to Ur-Pabilsag

Ur-Pabilsag (𒌨𒀭𒉺𒉋𒊕, ur-^{d}pa-bil_{2}-sag; died c. 2550 BC) was an early ruler of the First Dynasty of Ur in the 26th century BC. He does not appear in the Sumerian King List, but is known from an inscription fragment found in Ur, bearing the title "Ur-Pabilsag, king of Ur". It has been suggested that his tomb is at the Royal Cemetery at Ur (Grave PG 779). He may have died around 2550 BC.

It also has been suggested that Ur-Pabilsag was the son of king A-Imdugud, known from grave PG 1236, which is the largest and probably the earliest tomb structure at the Royal Cemetery at Ur. The tomb of Ur-Pabilsag (Grave PG 779) is generally considered as the second oldest at the site, and probably contemporary with grave PG 777, thought to be the tomb of his queen. Meskalamdug (grave PG 755, or possibly PG 789) may have been his son.

== Artifacts ==
Several artifacts are known from tomb PG 779 at the Royal Cemetery at Ur, such as the famous Standard of Ur, and decorated shell plaques.

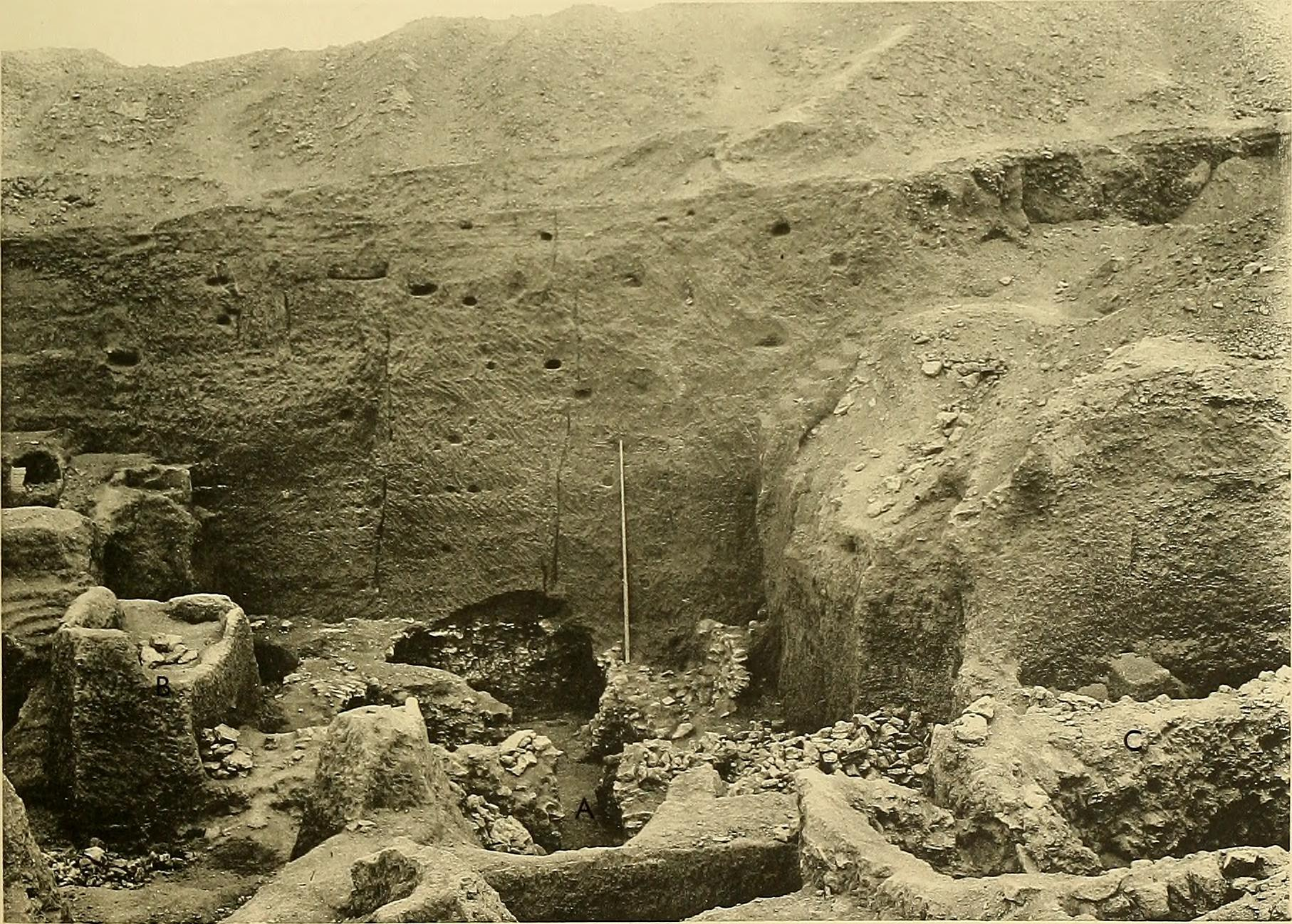
Tomb of Ur-Pabilsag in the center (PG 779, marked "A"), with the tomb of Meskalamdug on the left (PG 755, marked "B"), next to the royal tomb of the queen of Ur-Pabilsag (PG 777, marked "C")

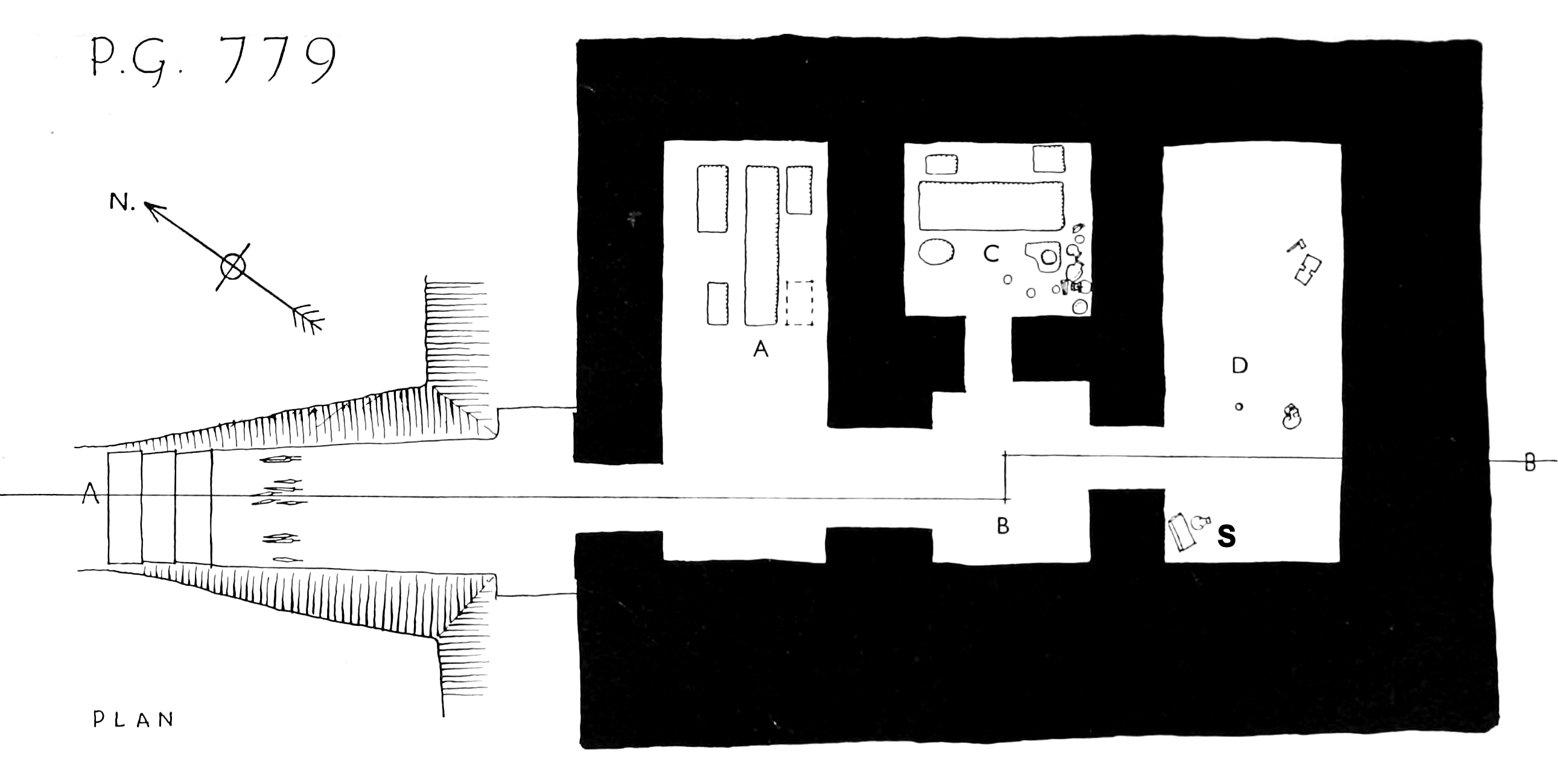
Plan of grave PG 779. The Standard of Ur was located in "S"

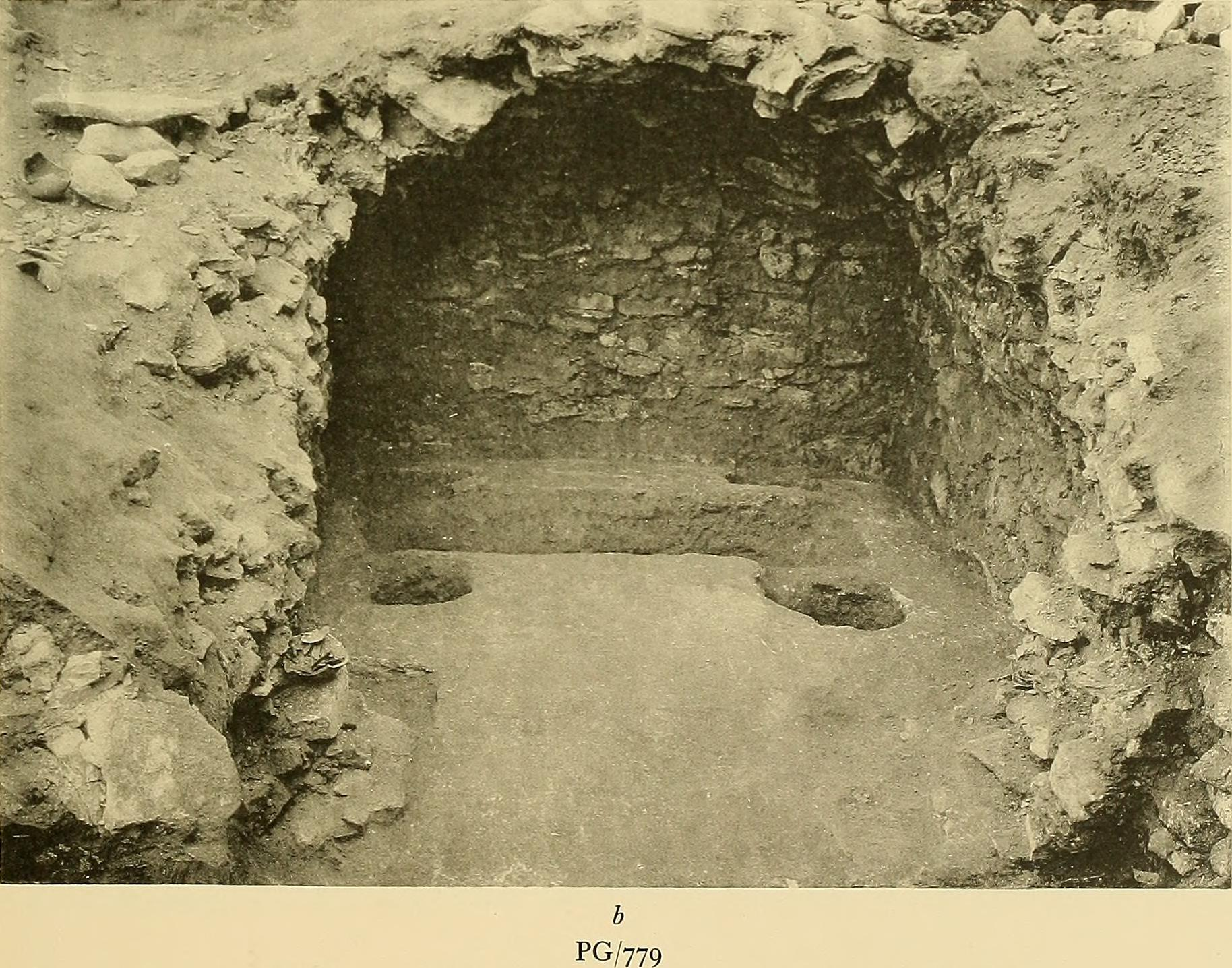
Grave PG 779, the tomb of Ur-Pabilsag

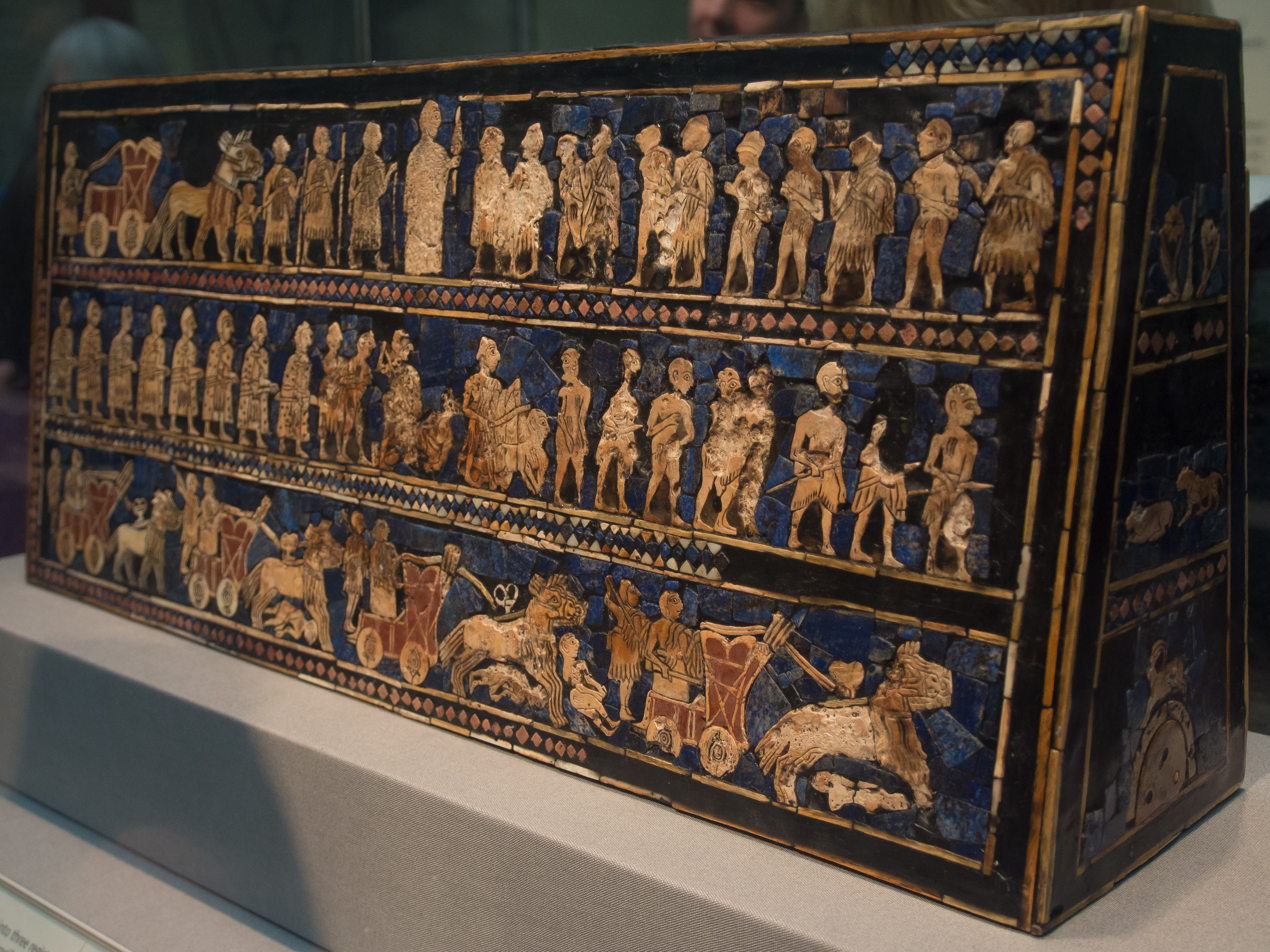
The Standard of Ur, from tomb PG 779

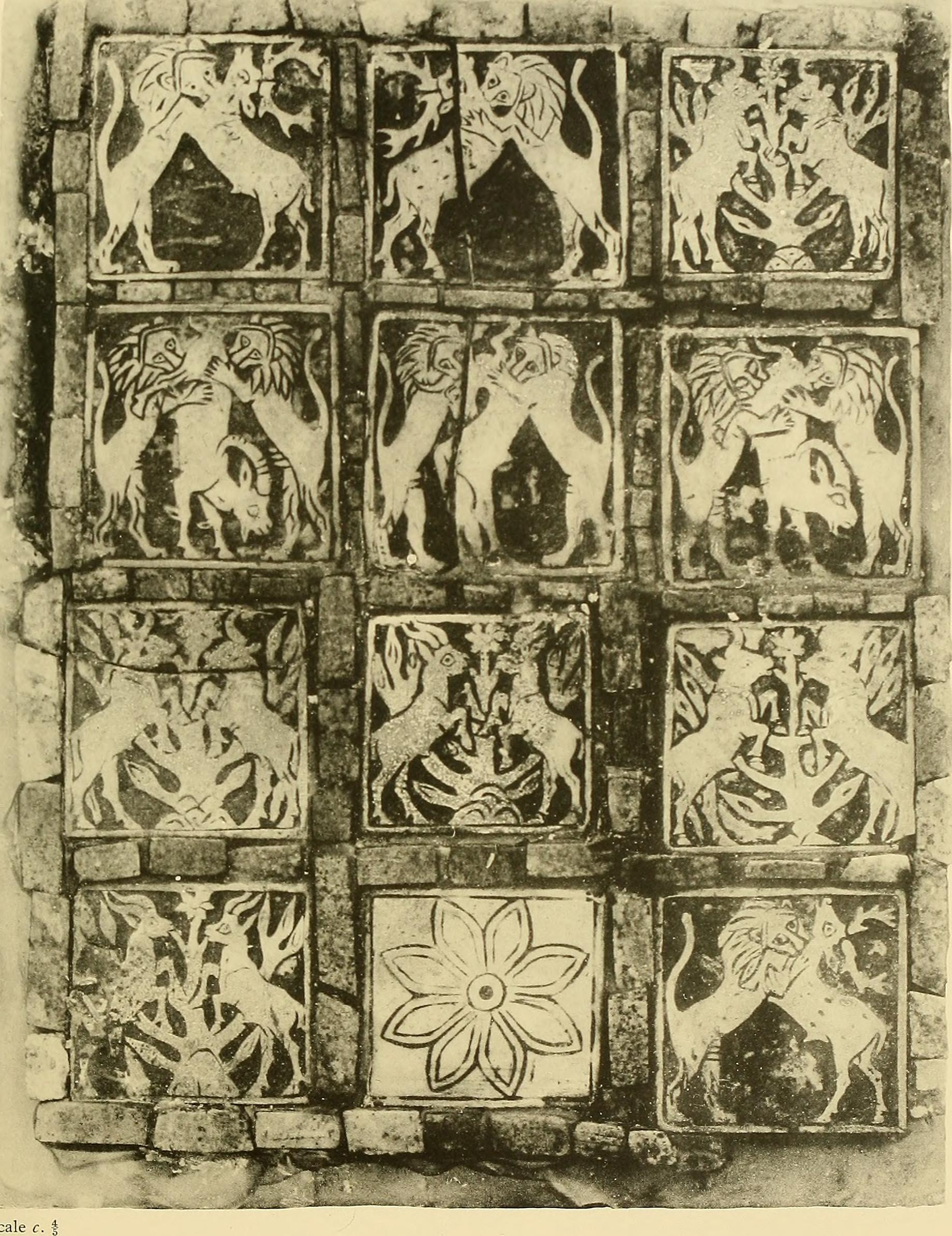
Shell inlay from tomb PG 779

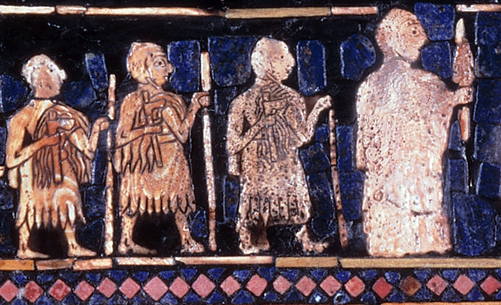
King at war, with soldiers, from the Standard of Ur

== See also ==
- Sumer
- History of Sumer
- Royal Cemetery at Ur
- Near Eastern archaeology

== Sources ==
- Jane McIntosh: Ancient Mesopotamia. ABC-CLIO 2005, ISBN 1-57607-965-1, p. 73 (restricted online version (google books))
- Leonard Woolley: The Sumerians. p. 38 (restricted online version (google books))

Regnal titles
Preceded by	King of Ur c. 2550 BC	Succeeded by
