= Meskalamdug =

Meskalamdug 𒈩𒌦𒄭
- King of Kish
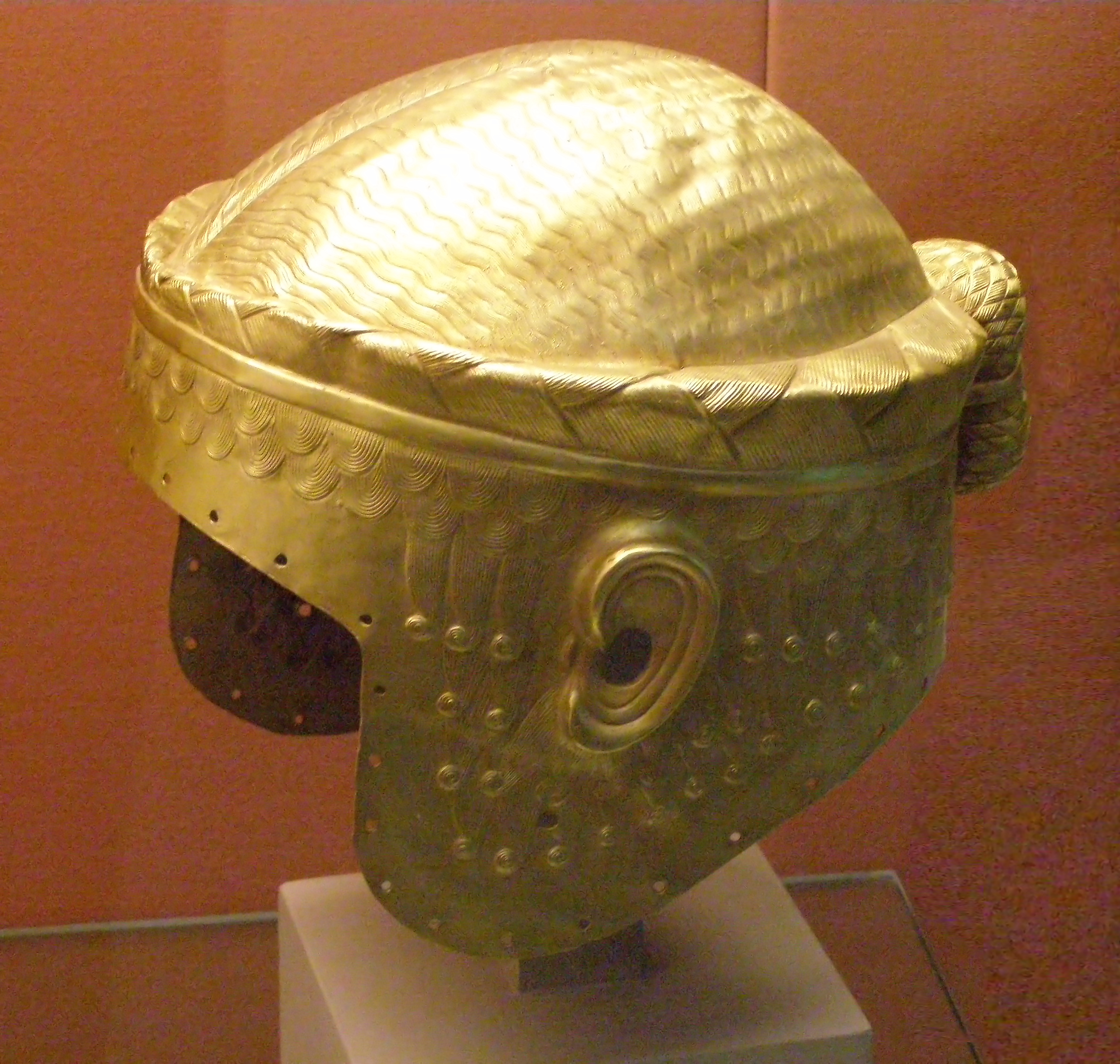
- Meskalamdug helmet, British Museum electrotype copy, original is in the Iraq Museum, Baghdad. The holes around the border suggest that another piece was normally affixed, as for example in the full mask attributed to Sargon of Akkad. The hairbun attached at the back of the head is visible in other rulers as well, such as Sargon or Eannatum in the Stele of the Vultures.

King of Ur
- Reign: c. 2550 BC
- Predecessor: Possibly Ur-Pabilsag
- Successor: Possibly Akalamdug
- Issue: Mesannepada
- House: First Dynasty of Ur

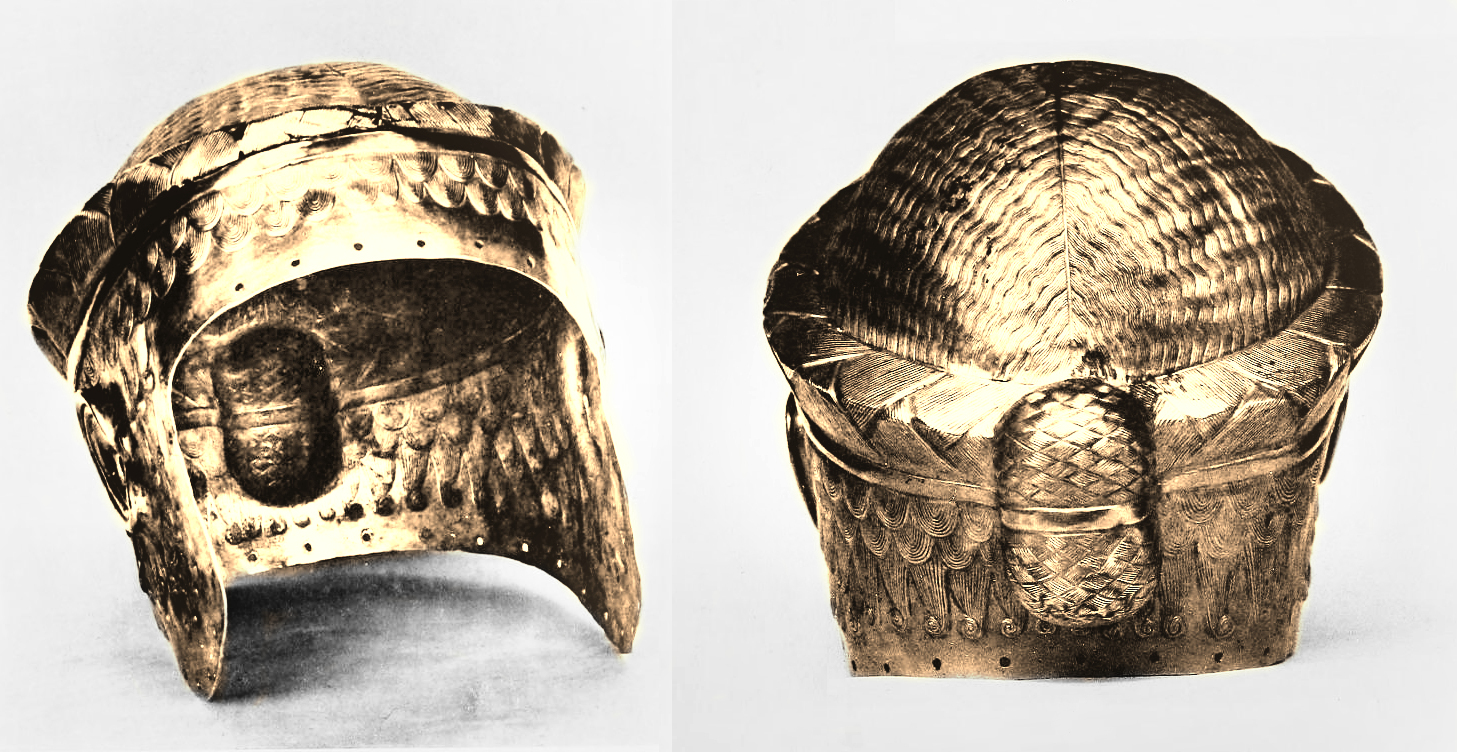
Golden helmet of Meskalamdug, at time of excavation

Location of Ur

Meskalamdug (𒈩𒌦𒄭, Meskalamdùg [mes-KALAM-du10] "hero of the good land"; fl. c. 2550 BC) was an early Sumerian ruler of the First Dynasty of Ur in the 26th century BCE. He does not appear in the Sumerian King List, but is known from a royal cylinder seal, a royal bead inscription found in Mari, both mentioning him as King, and possibly his tomb, grave PG 755 at the Royal Cemetery at Ur.

It has been suggested that Puabi may have been his second queen.

== Royal seal ==
The existence of a "King Meskalamdug" is known for certain, from a seal discovered at the Royal Cemetery of Ur (cylinder seal U 11751, discovered in the tomb of a queen, PG 1054), which bears the title Meskalamdug Lugal (𒈩𒌦𒄭 𒈗) "King Meskalamdug". The same name of "Meskalamdug" has been found inscribed on the grave goods of tomb PG 755 at the Royal Cemetery of Ur, but without the title "King", which has raised doubts about the identification of King Meskalamdug with the young man found in that rather small grave.

The seal is made of shell, with a core in lapis-lazuli. It shows two crossed lions attacking bulls, with Enkidu and a naked man in profile participating in the fight. It is now in the British Museum (BM 122536).

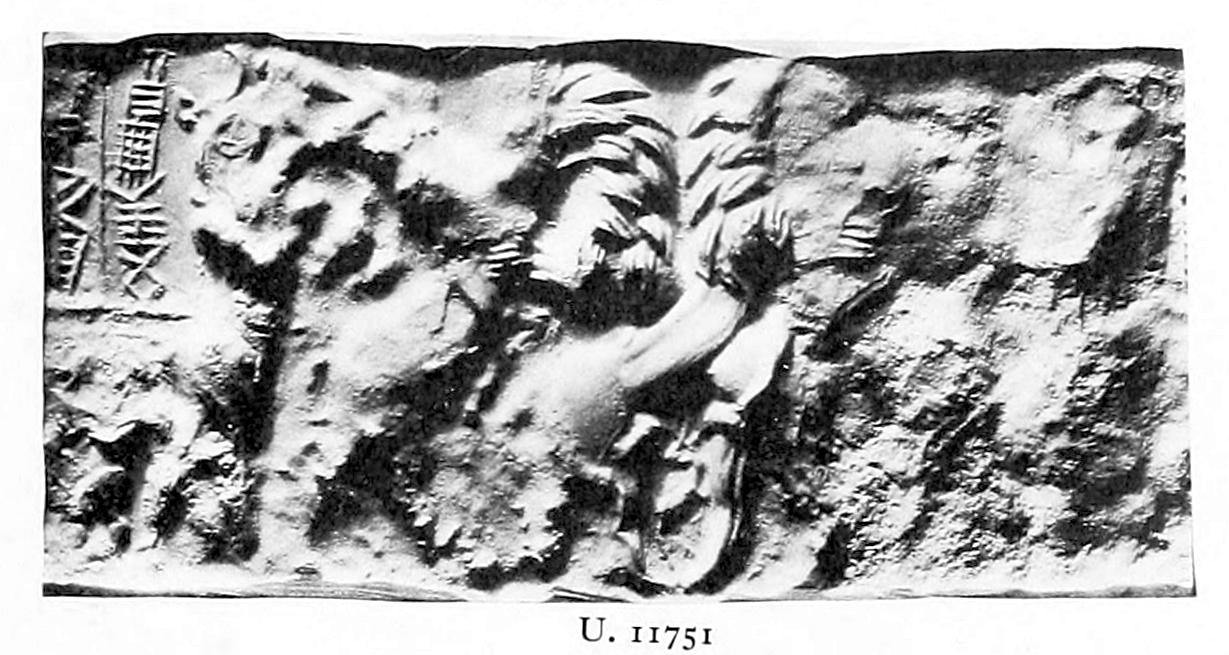
Seal of King Meskalamdug, with inscription Meskalamdug Lugal (𒈩𒌦𒄭 𒈗) "King Meskalamdug".

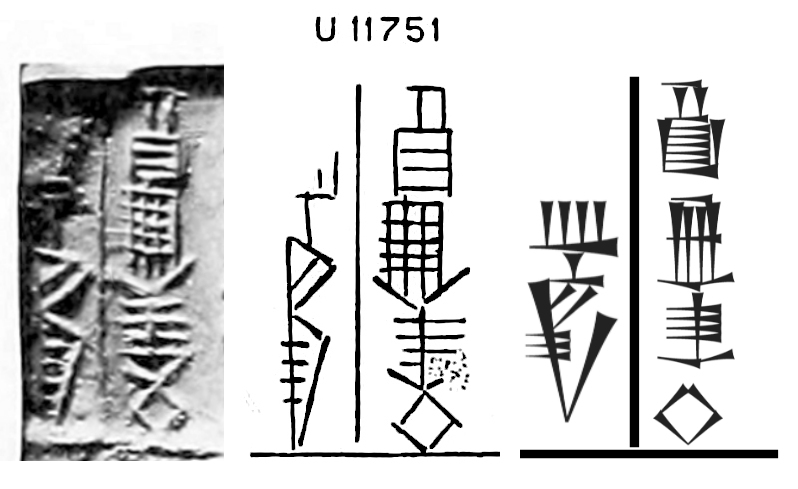
Inscription Meskalamdug Lugal (𒈩𒌦𒄭 𒈗) "King Meskalamdug", on the seal (upper left corner)

== Mari bead ==
King Meskalamdug is again mentioned on a lapis-lazuli bead found in Mari, in the so-called "Treasure of Ur". It reads:

𒀭𒈗𒌦 / 𒈩𒀭𒉌𒅆𒊒𒁕 / 𒈗𒋀𒀊𒆠 / 𒌉𒈩𒌦𒄭 / 𒈗𒆧𒆠 / 𒀀𒈬𒈾𒊒

^{d}lugal-kalam / mes-an-ne2-pa3-da / lugal uri5^{ki} / dumu mes-ug-du10 / lugal kish^{ki} / a munaru

"To god Lugalkalam ("the Lord of the Land", identified with Dagan or Enlil), Mesannepada, king of Ur, son of Meskalamdug, king of Kish, has consecrated this bead""

— Mesannepada Mari bead

It is unclear how this bead came to be in Mari, which was quite far from Ur (about 700 kilometers northwest), but this points to some kind of relation between Ur and Mari at that time. The bead was discovered in a jar containing other objects from Ur or Kish, probably used as a dedication to a local temple. The God "Lugal-kalam" (𒀭𒈗𒌦, "Lord of the Land") to whom the dedication is made, is otherwise known in a dedication by a local ruler Šaba (Šalim) of Mari, also as Lugal-kalam, or in the dedication of Ishtup-Ilum where he is named "Lugal-mātim" (𒀭𒈗𒈤𒁴, "Lord of the Land"), and is considered identical with the local deity Dagan, or Enlil.

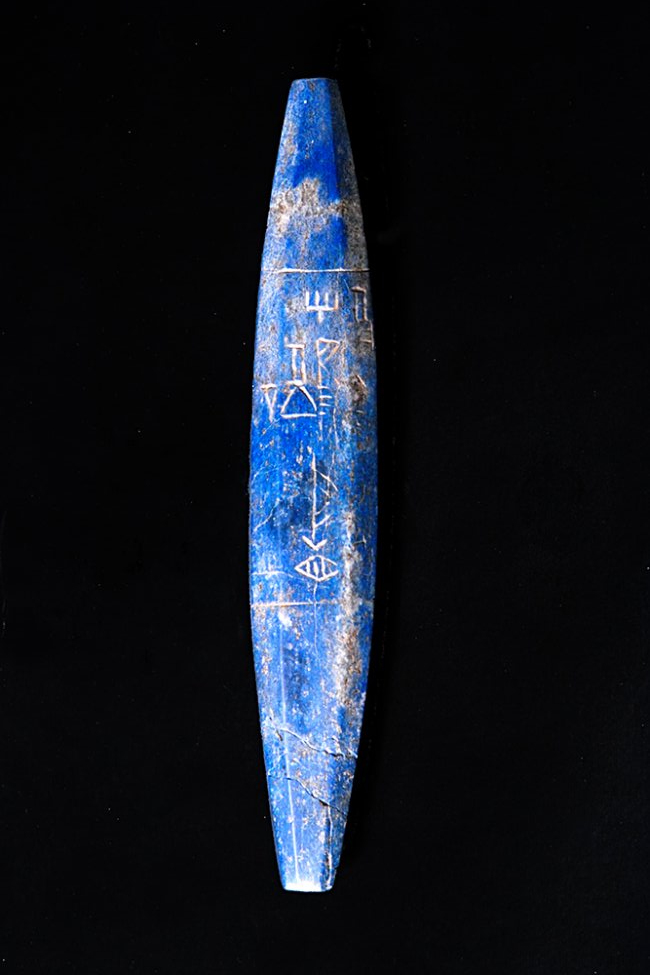
The lapis lazuli bead from Mari, with the inscription by Mesannepada, son of Meskalamdug. National Museum of Damascus, Syria.

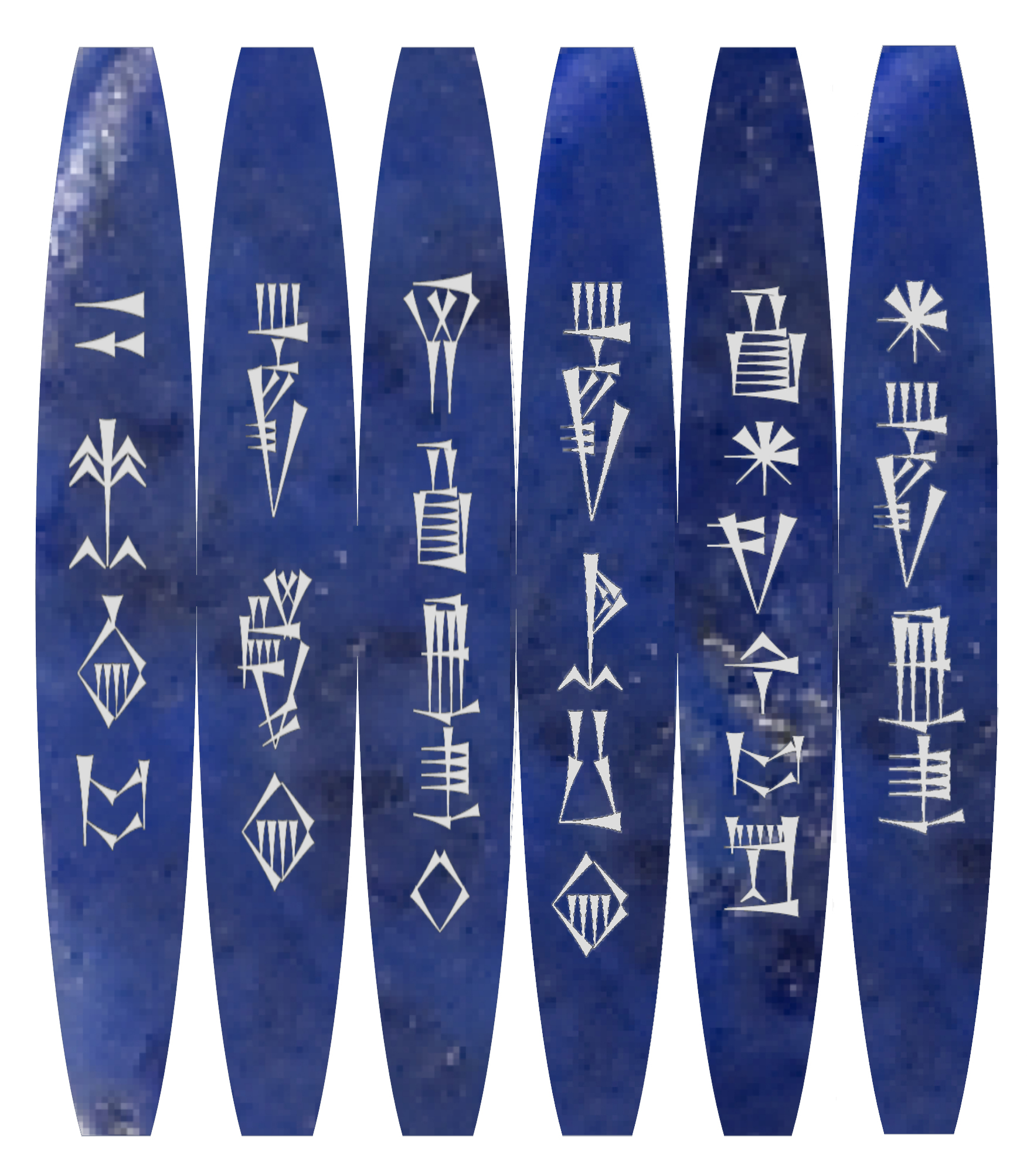
Transcription of the Mari bead.

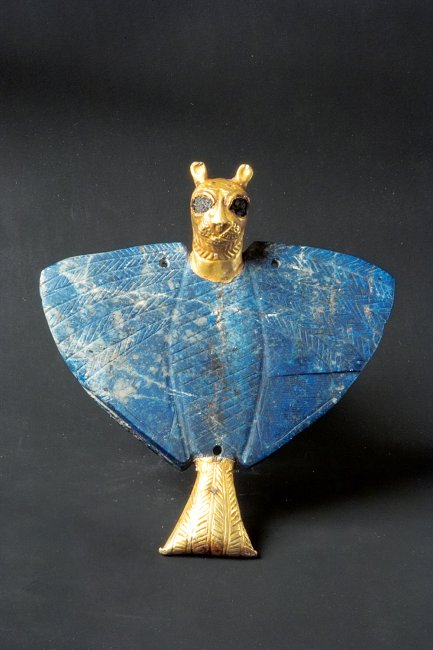
The "Lion-Eagle" was found together with the lapis-lazuli bead in the same dedication jar, the so-called "Treasure of Ur", in Mari.

== Tomb of Meskalamdug (PG 755) ==
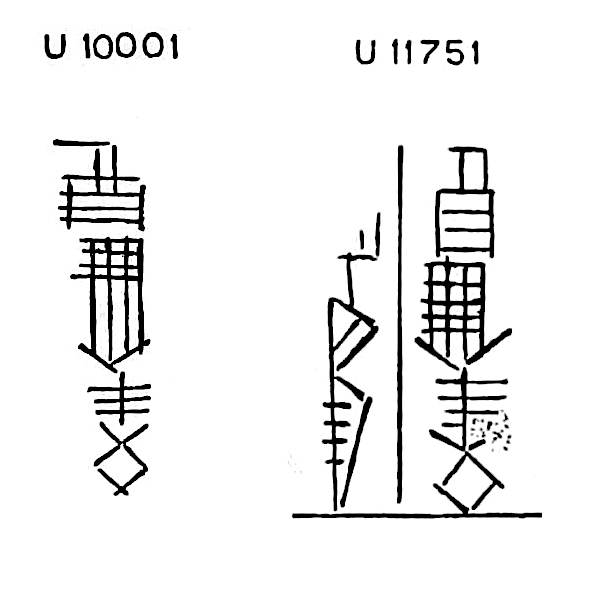
Inscriptions related to Meskalamdug, found at the Royal Cemetery at Ur: U 10001: "Meskalamdug" (on a golden bowl found in tomb PG 755) U 11751: "Meslamdug, King" (discovered on a seal impression in tomb PG 1054)

The tomb of Meskalamdug, PG 755, discovered by English archaeologist Sir Leonard Woolley in the Royal Cemetery of Ur in 1924, contained numerous gold artifacts including a golden helmet with an inscription of the king's name. By observing the contents of this royal grave, it is clear that this ancient civilization was wealthy. Meskalamdug's wife's name was queen Ninbanda. Meskalamdug was also mentioned on a seal in another tomb with the title lugal (king). However, because his own tomb lacked attendants, Woolley assumed that he was not royal. The controversy remains though, because he is named on a bead inscription discovered in Mari by French archaeologist André Parrot ten years later, as the father of king Mesannepada of Ur, who appears in the king list and in many other inscriptions.

Since tomb PG 755 lacks the monumental scale and splendor of other royal tombs at the Royal Cemetery of Ur, it has been suggested that it was not the tomb of king Meskalamdug himself, but rather a young prince of the same name, for example a son of king Meskalamdug and queen Nibanda. Assyriologist Julian Reade has suggested that tomb PG 755 was the tomb of a "Prince Meskalamdug", and that the actual tomb of the King Meskalamdug, known from seal U 11751, was tomb PG 789. Alternatively, it may be more likely that the Meskalamdug of the inscriptions in tomb PG 755, and the Meskalamdug of the royal seal are simply the same person, who took the royal title lugal at a late stage of his life.

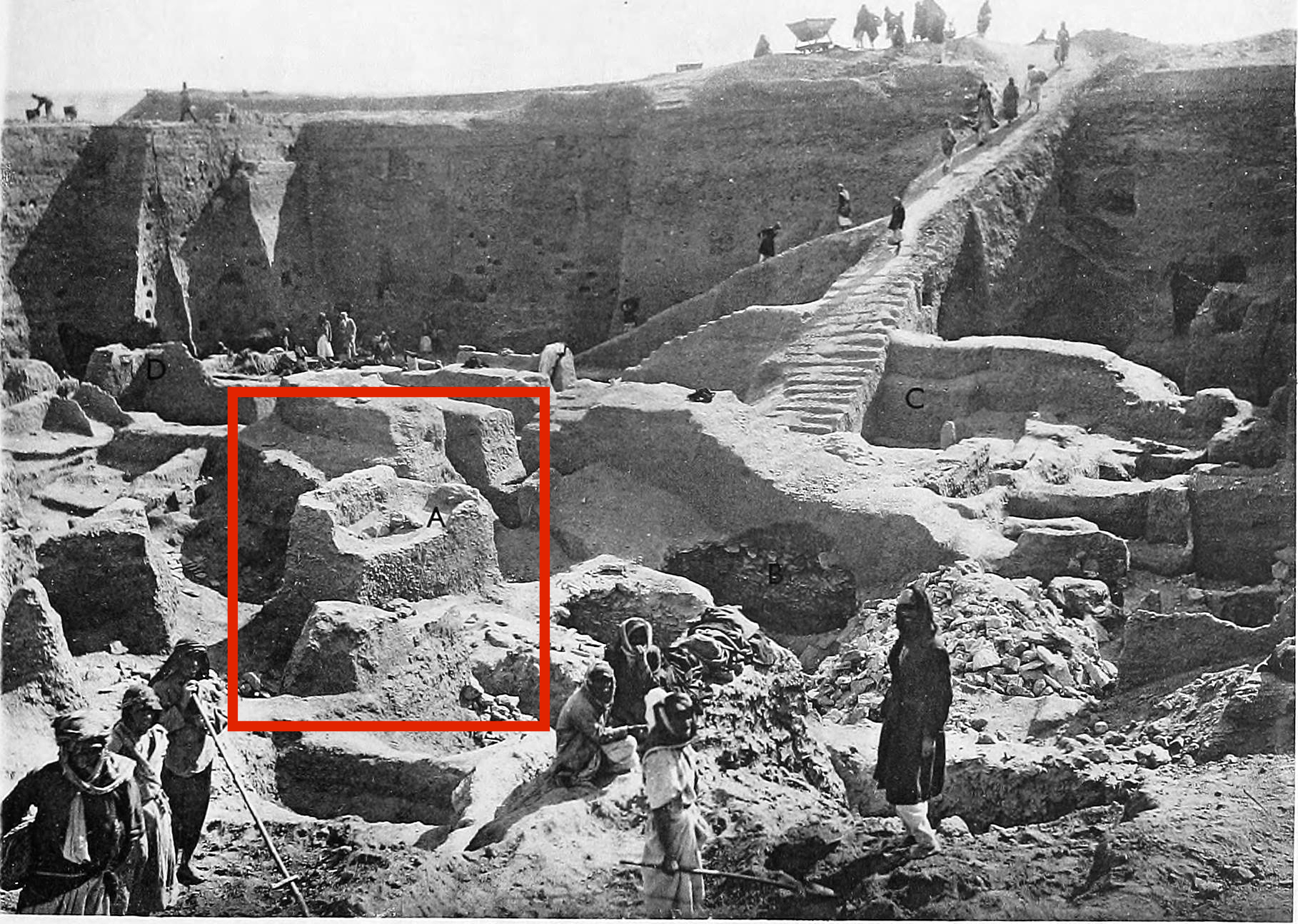
Grave of Meskalamdug (PG 755, "A")

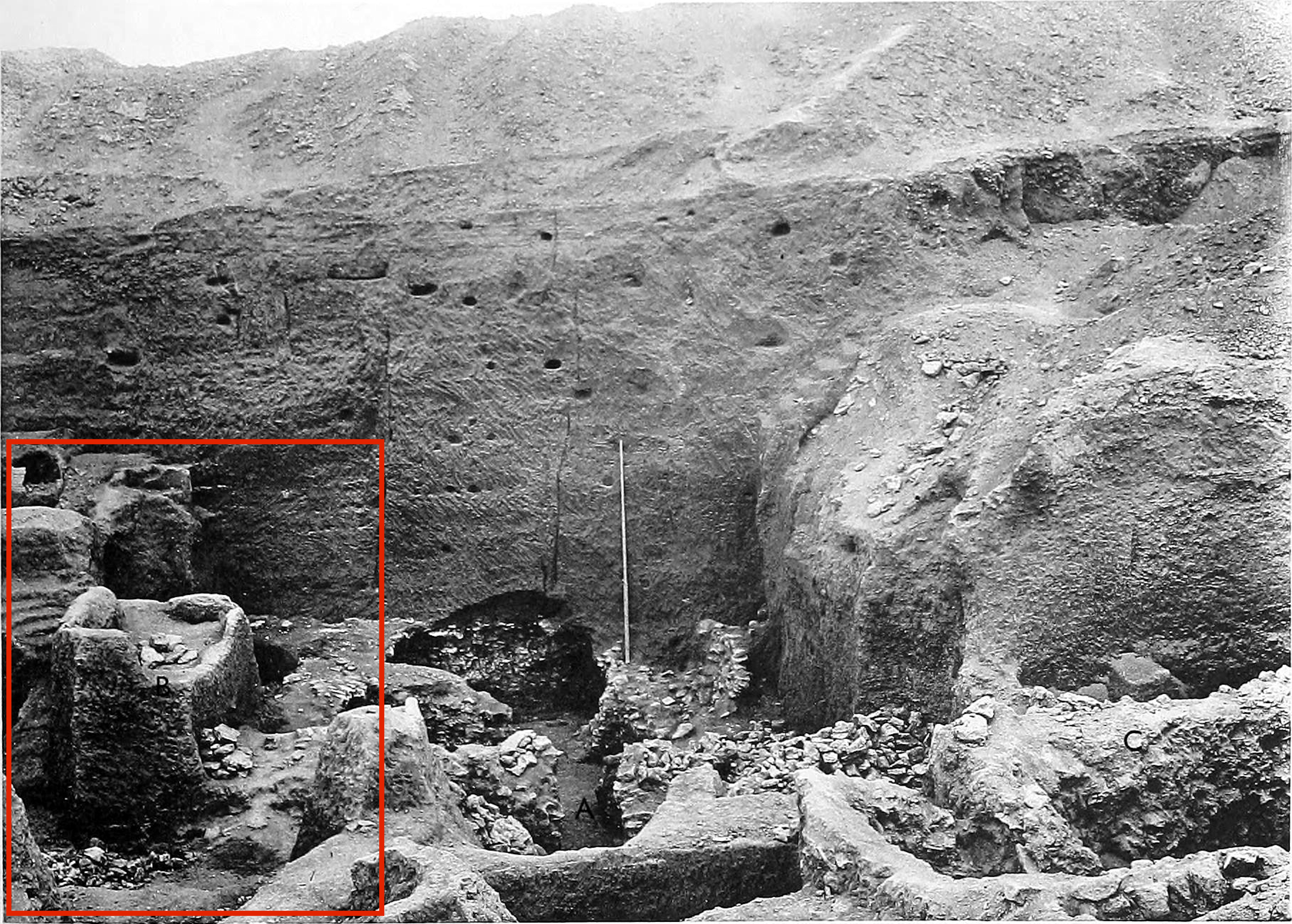
Grave of Meskalamdug (PG 755, marked "B" on the left), next to royal tomb of Ur-Pabilsag (PG 779, marked "A" in the center) and tomb of Ur-Pabilsag's queen on the right (PG 777, "C")

=== Tomb artifacts (tomb PG 755) ===
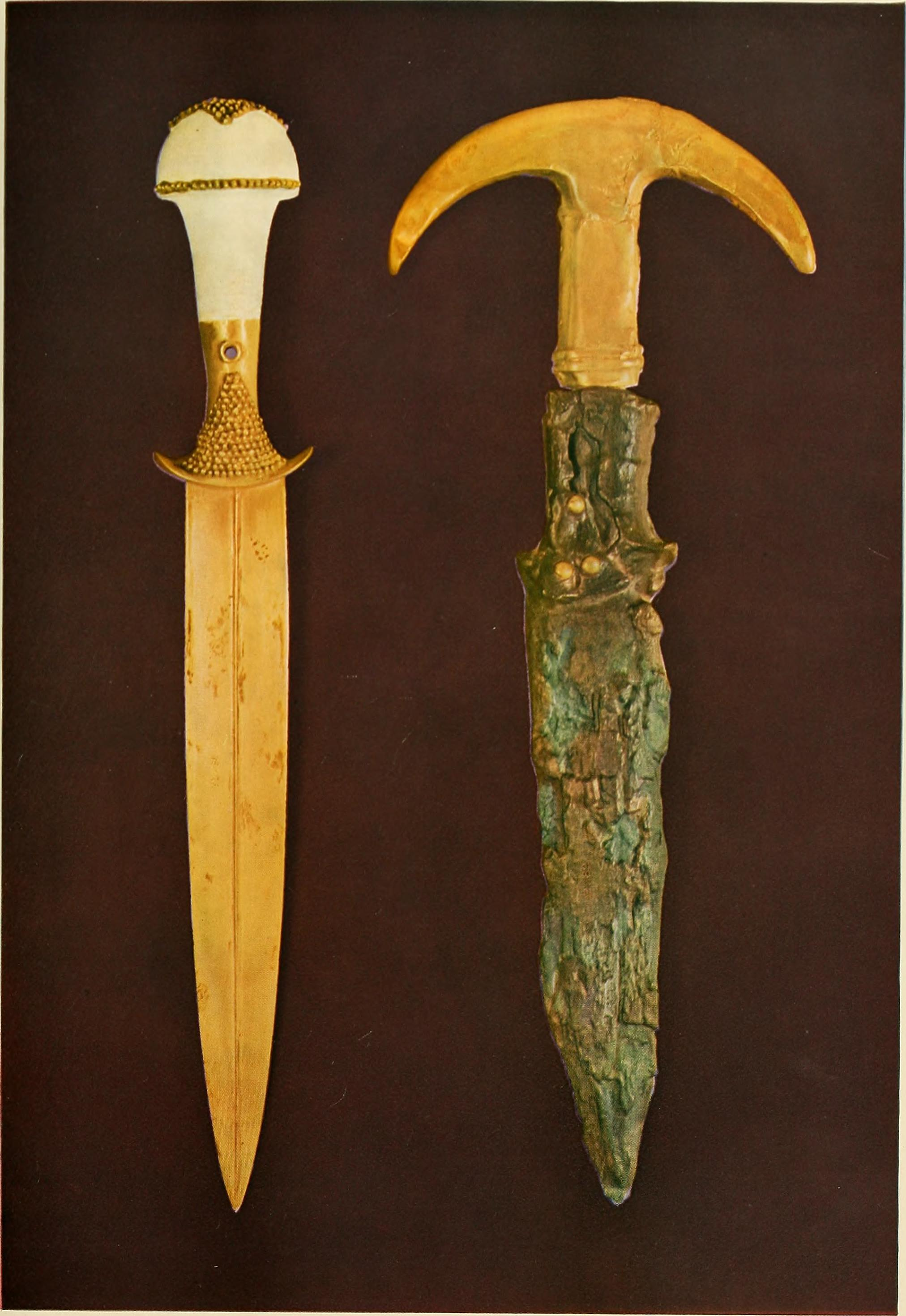
A gold dagger and a dagger with a gold-plated handle, grave PG 755, Ur excavations (1900).

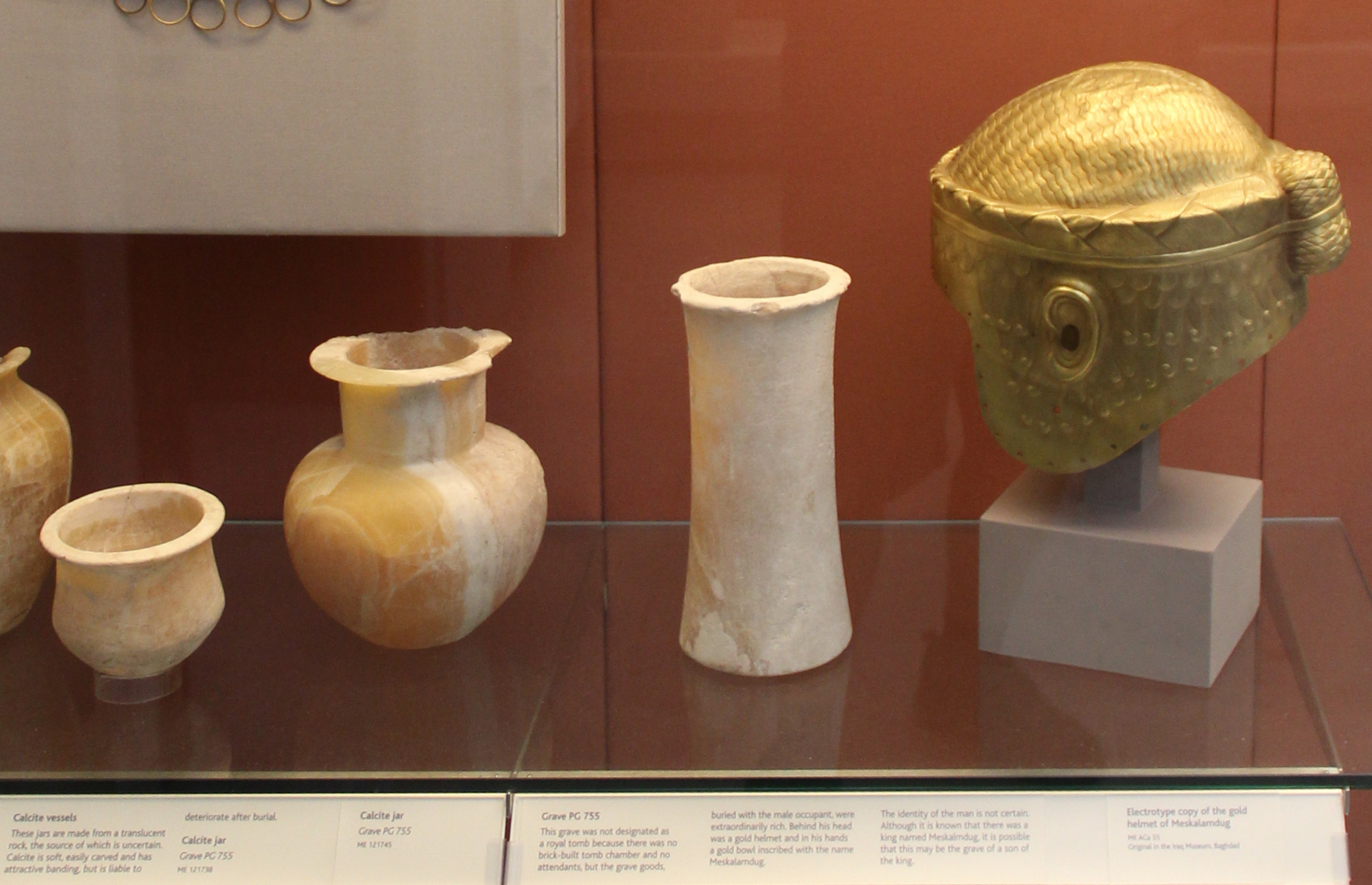
Alabaster vases and helmet from the grave of Meskalamdug, grave PG 755

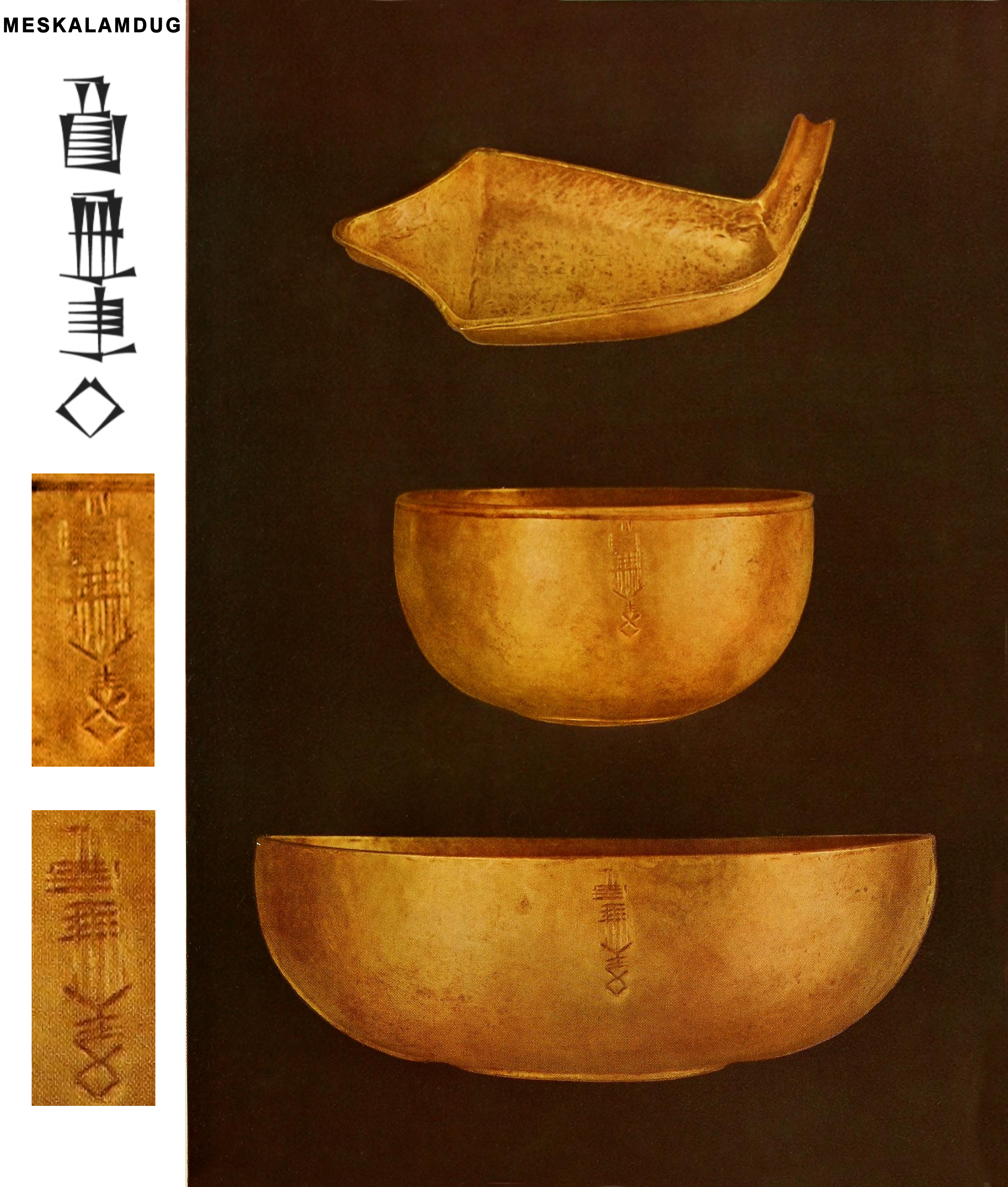
Golden bowls found in the tomb of Meskalamdug (grave PG 755), with vertical inscription of his name 𒈩𒌦𒄭, "Meskalamdug".

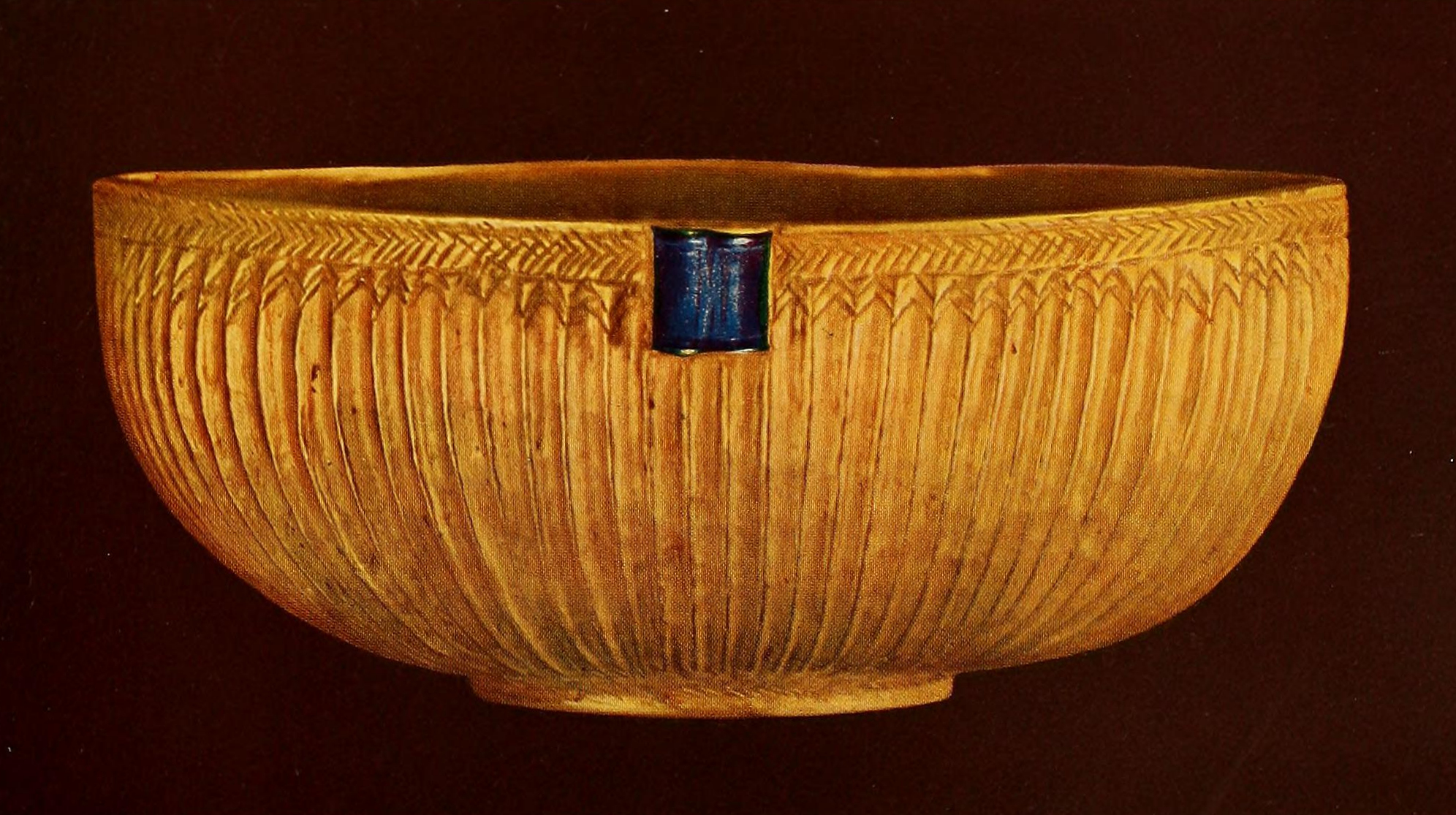
Golden bowl from the grave of Meskalamdug (PG 755, Ur)

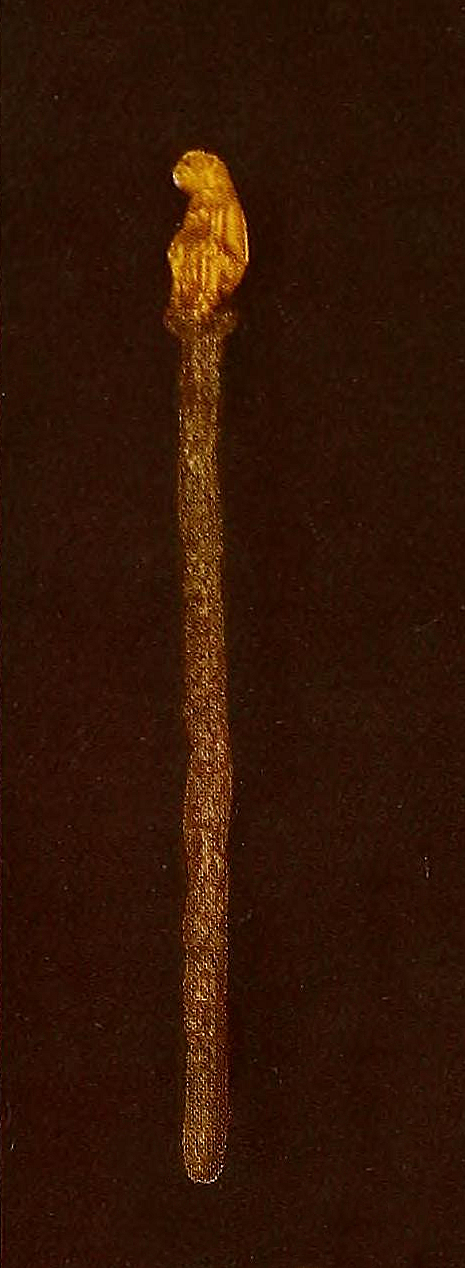
Gold monkey of Meskalamdug (grave PG 755 at Ur)

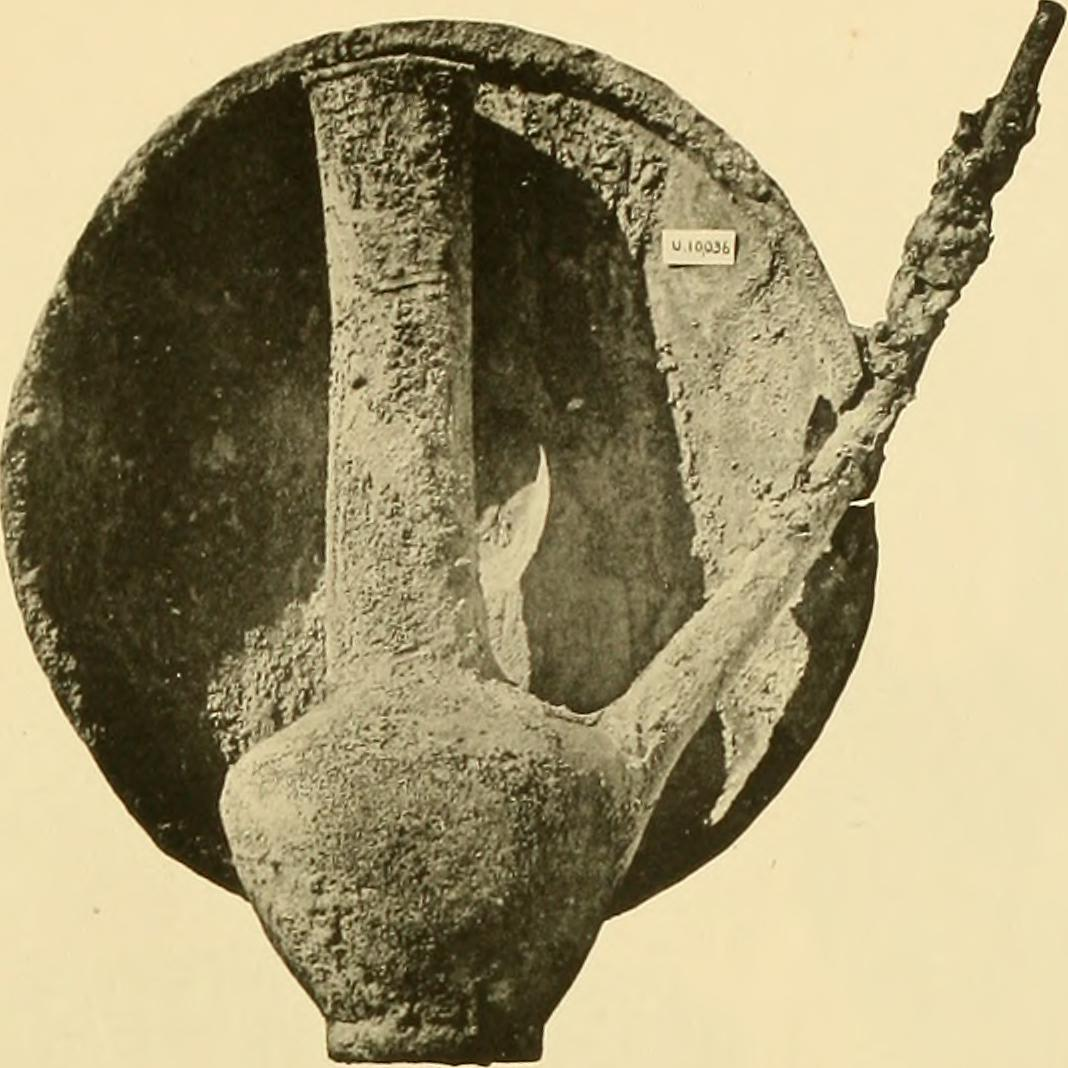
Silver ewer and copper paten from the tomb of Meskalamdug.

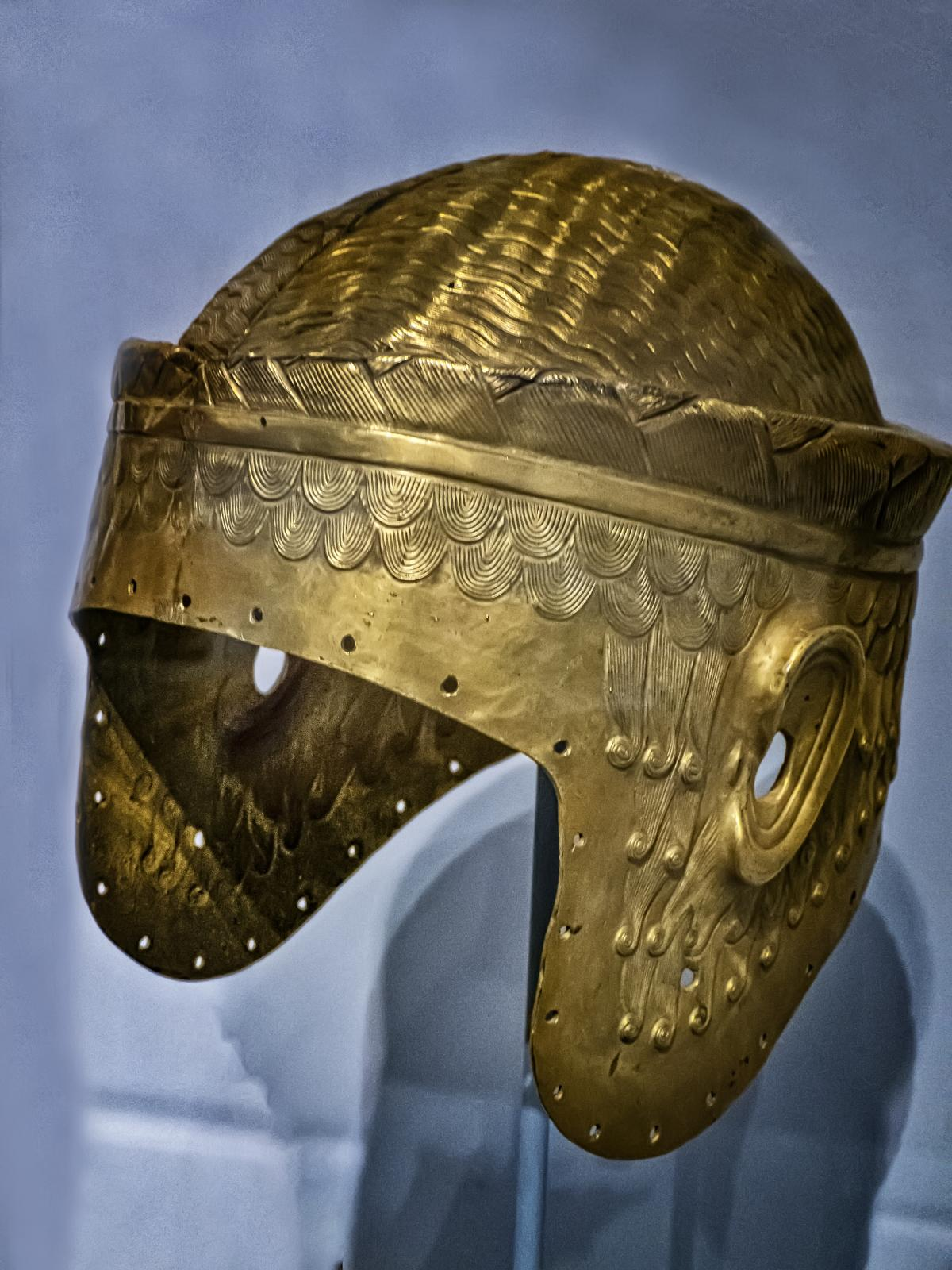
Electrotype reproduction of the helmet of Meskalamdug. Penn Museum

== An alternative: the "King's grave" (tomb PG 789) ==
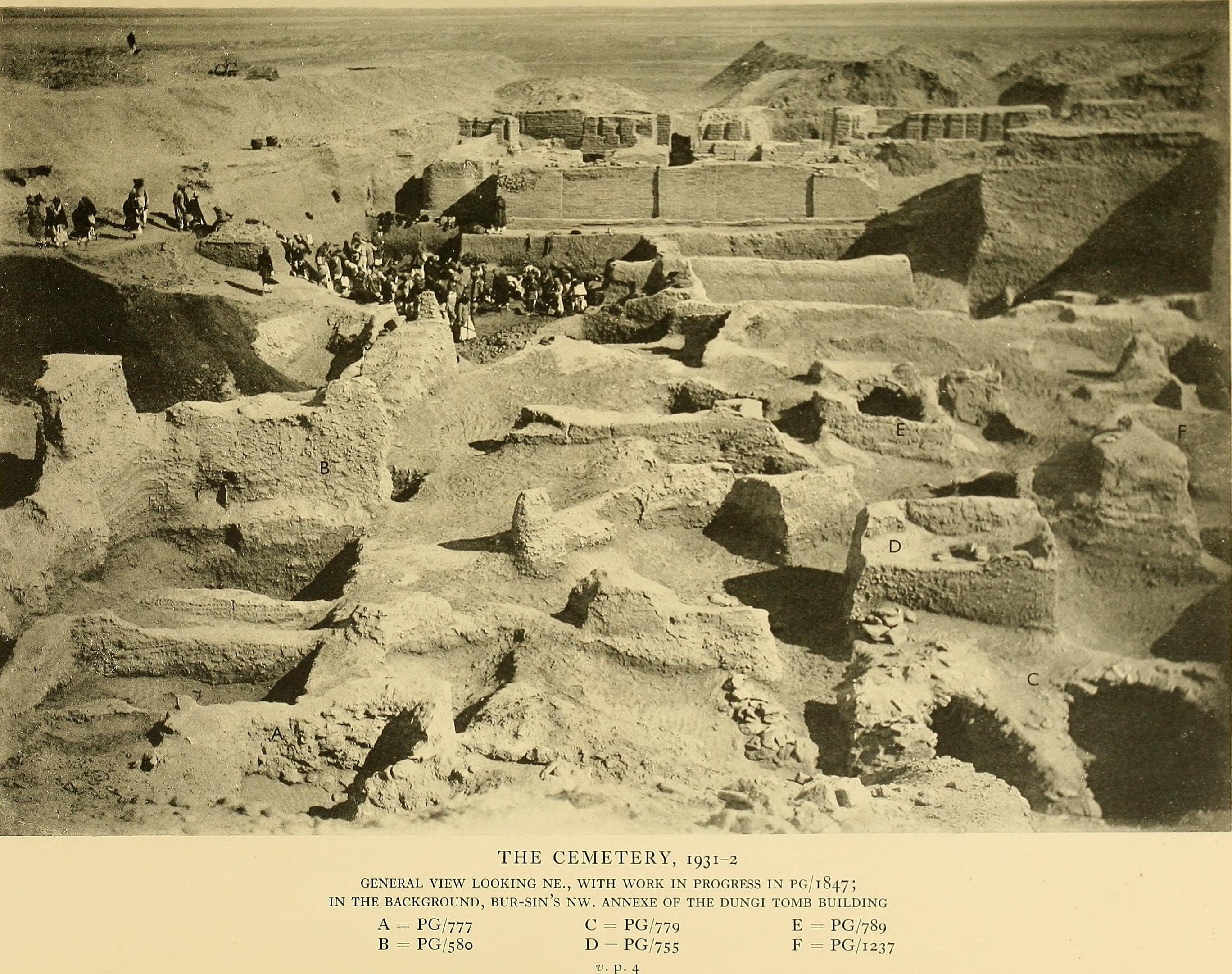
Tomb PG 789 appears in "E", just behind Tomb PG 755

According to Julian Reade, tomb PG 755 was the tomb of a "Prince Meskalamdug", but the actual tomb of King Meskalamdug, known from seal U 11751, is more likely to be royal tomb PG 789. This tomb has been called "the King's grave", where the remains of numerous royal attendants and many beautiful objects were recovered, and is located right next to the tomb of Queen Puabi, thought to be the second wife of King Meskalamdug.

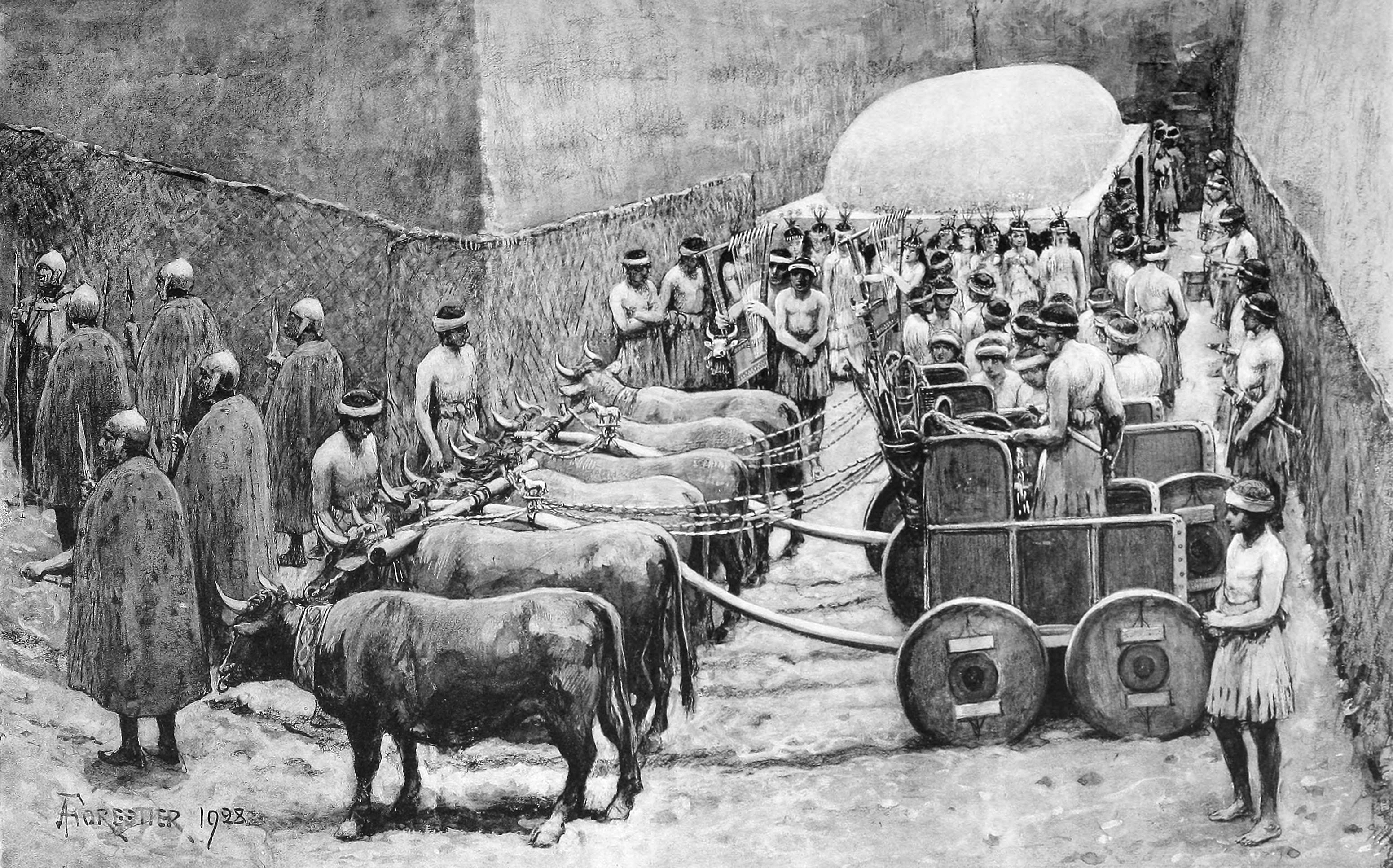
Funeral disposition in the great death pit, PG 789. The King's tomb would be the dome in the back (reconstitution).

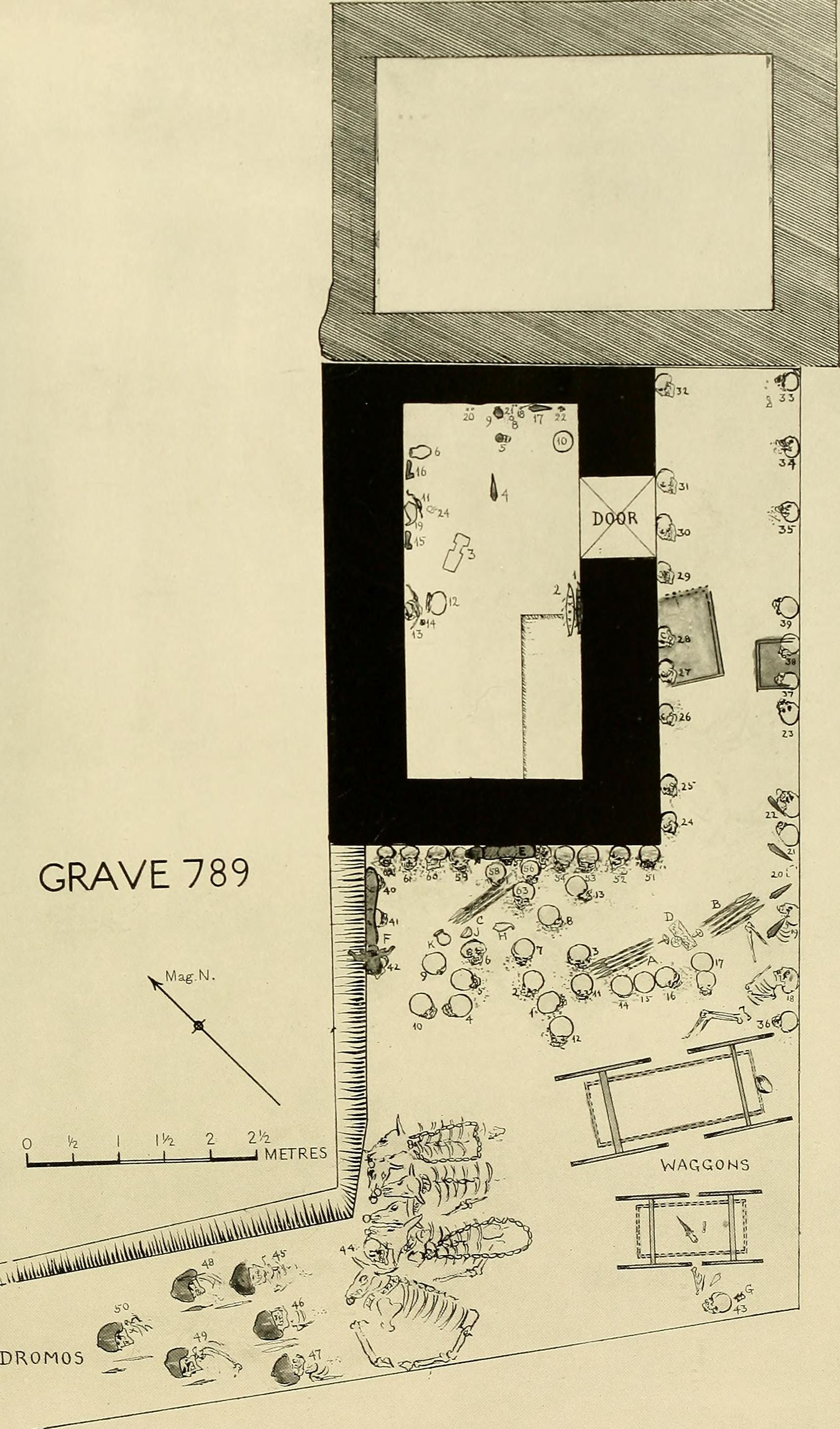
Plan of tomb PG 789.

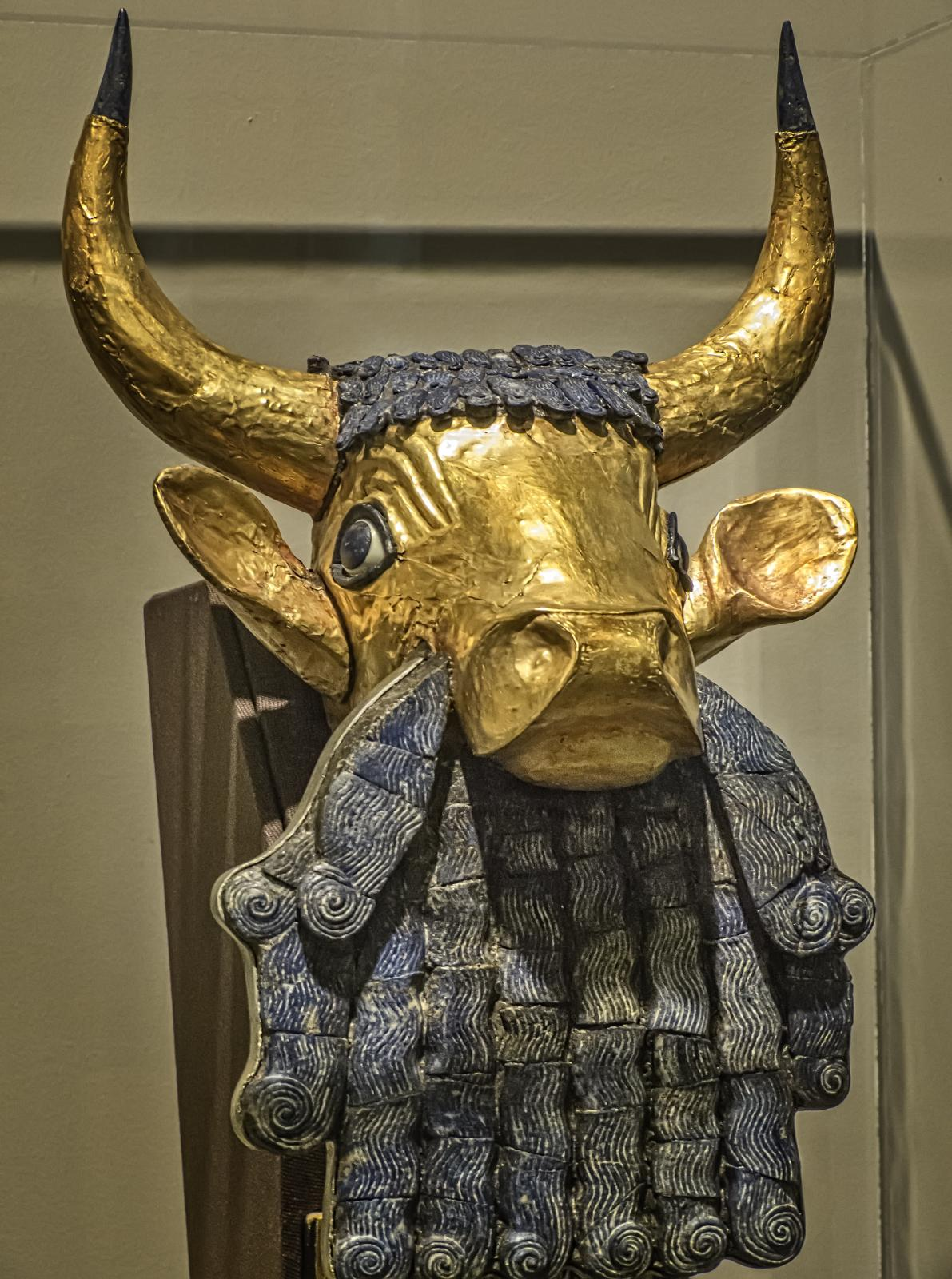
Bull head in a lyre.

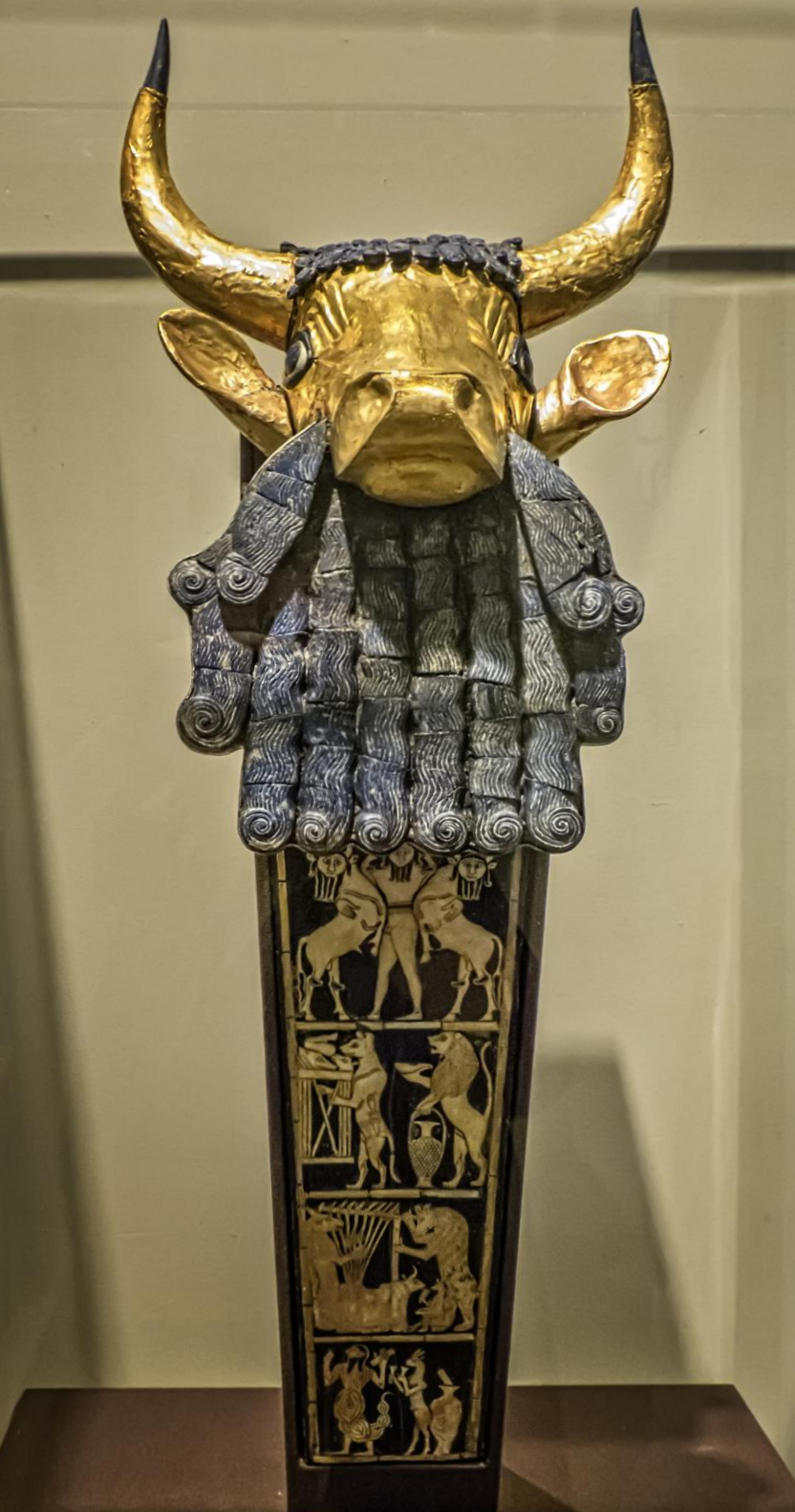
Bull-headed lyre recovered from the royal cemetery of Ur Iraq 2550-2450 BCE

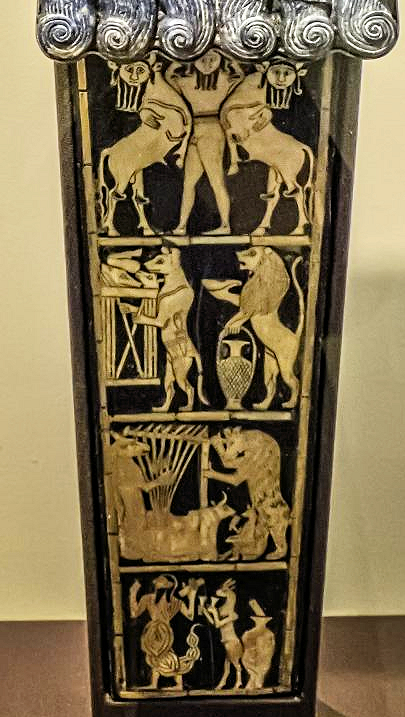
Nacre plate on lyre, with anthropomorphic animals, PG 789.

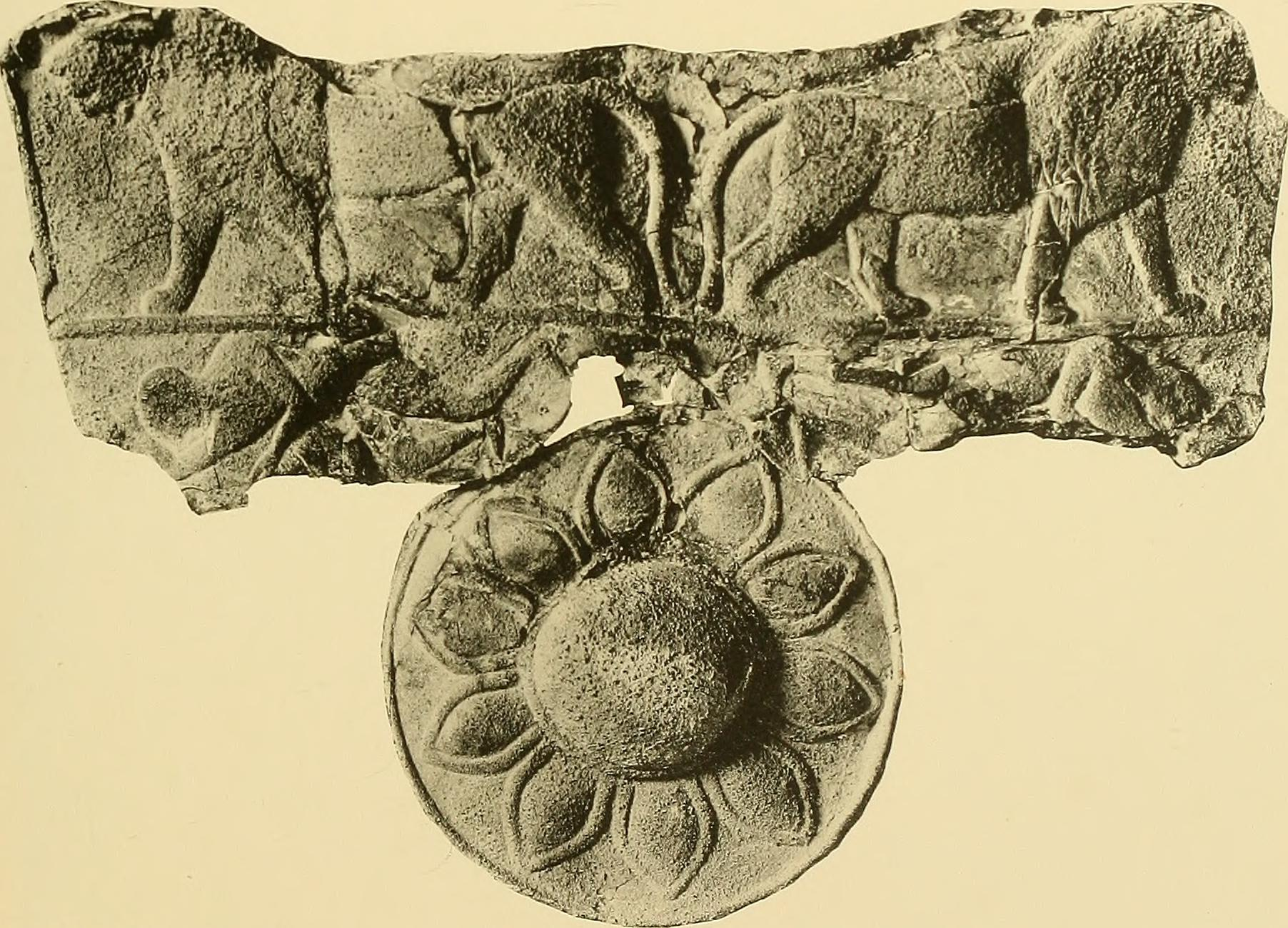
Plate from PG 789.

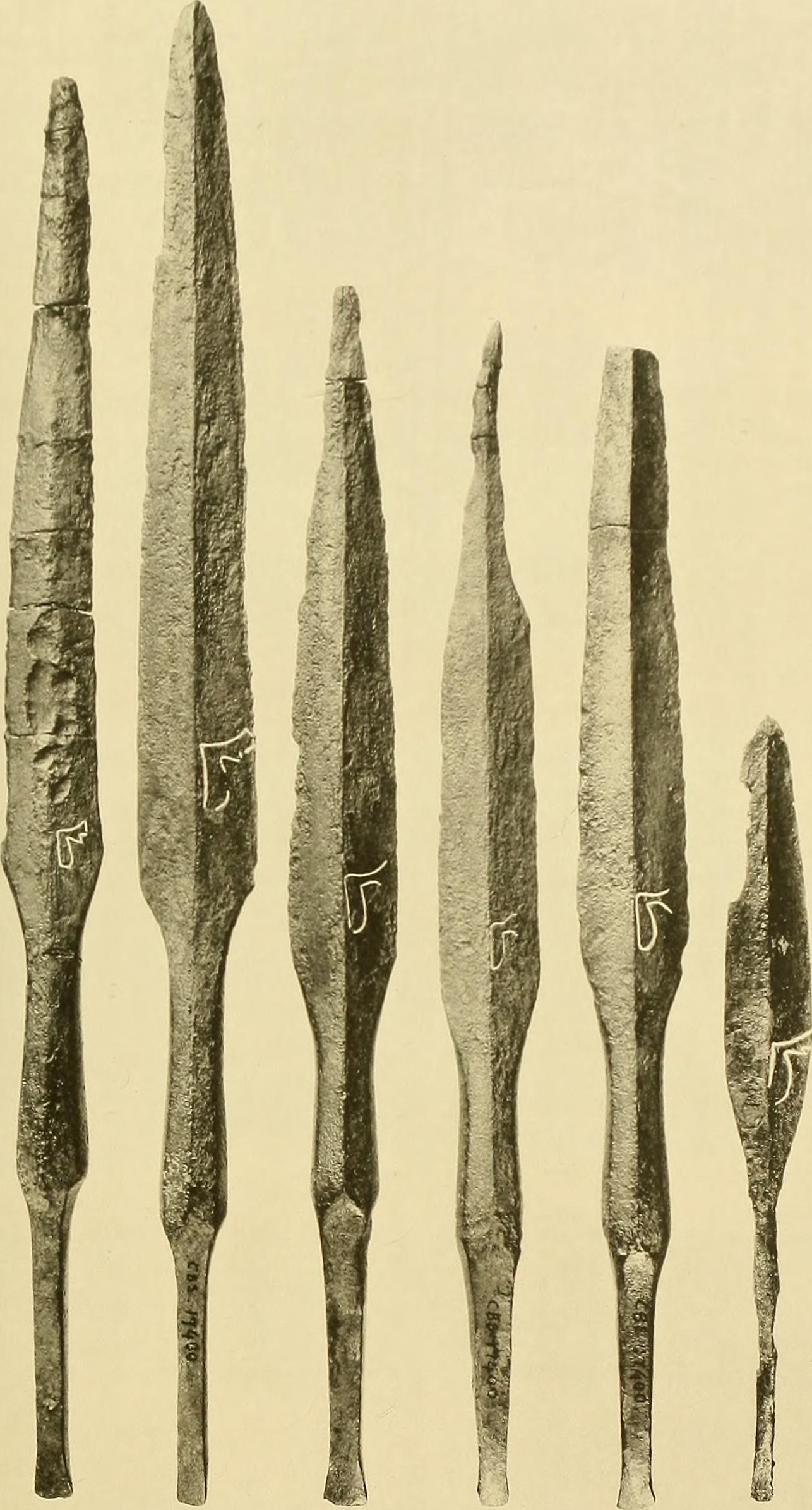
Spear blades, PG 789.

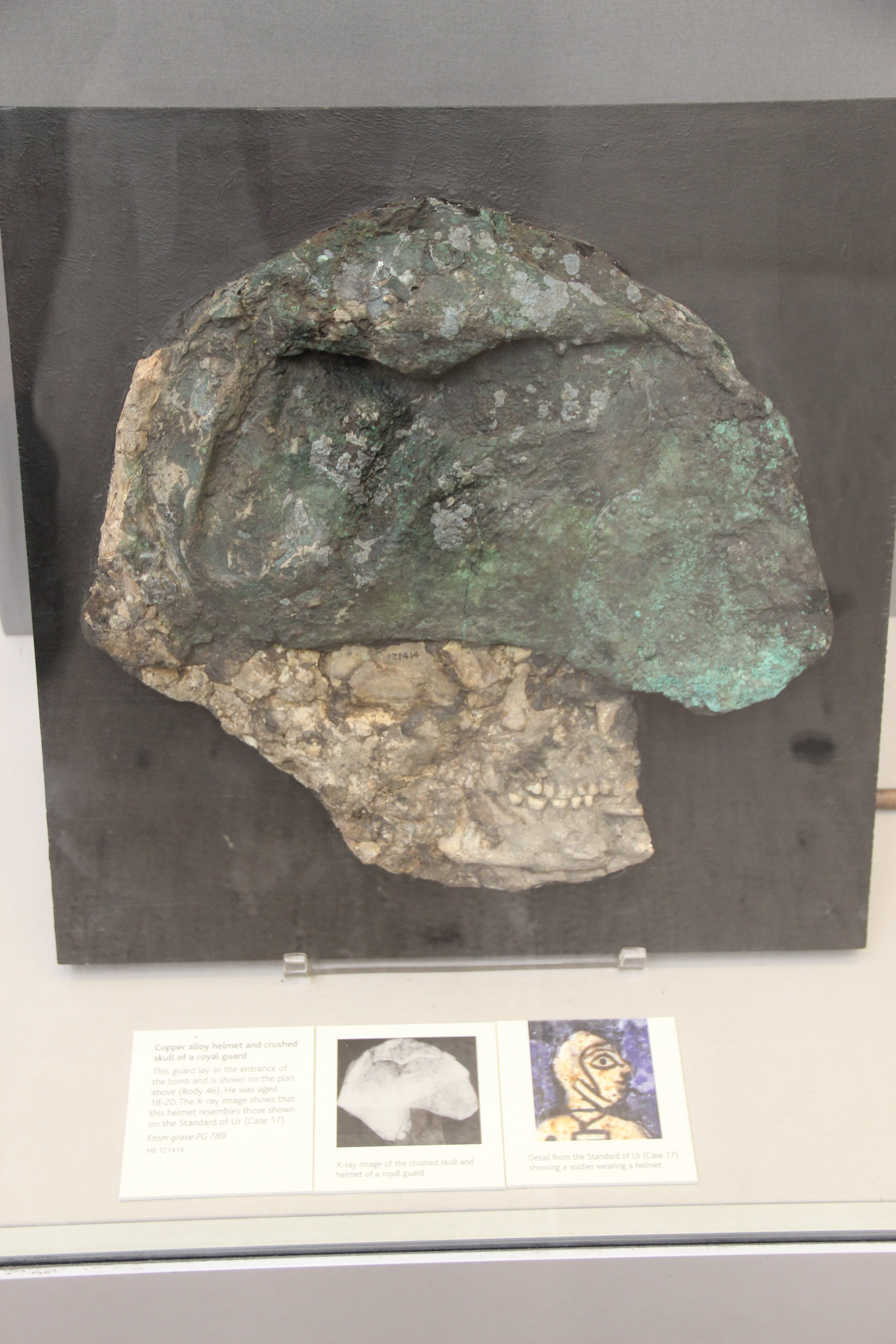
Copper Alloy Helmet & Crushed Head of Royal Guard, PG 789.

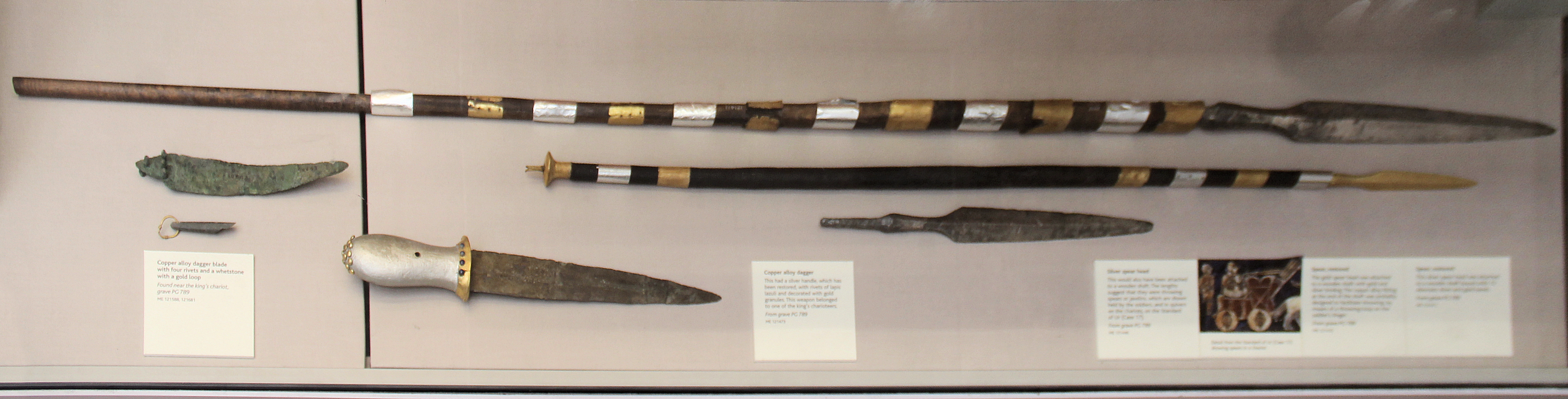
Weapons from tomb PG 789

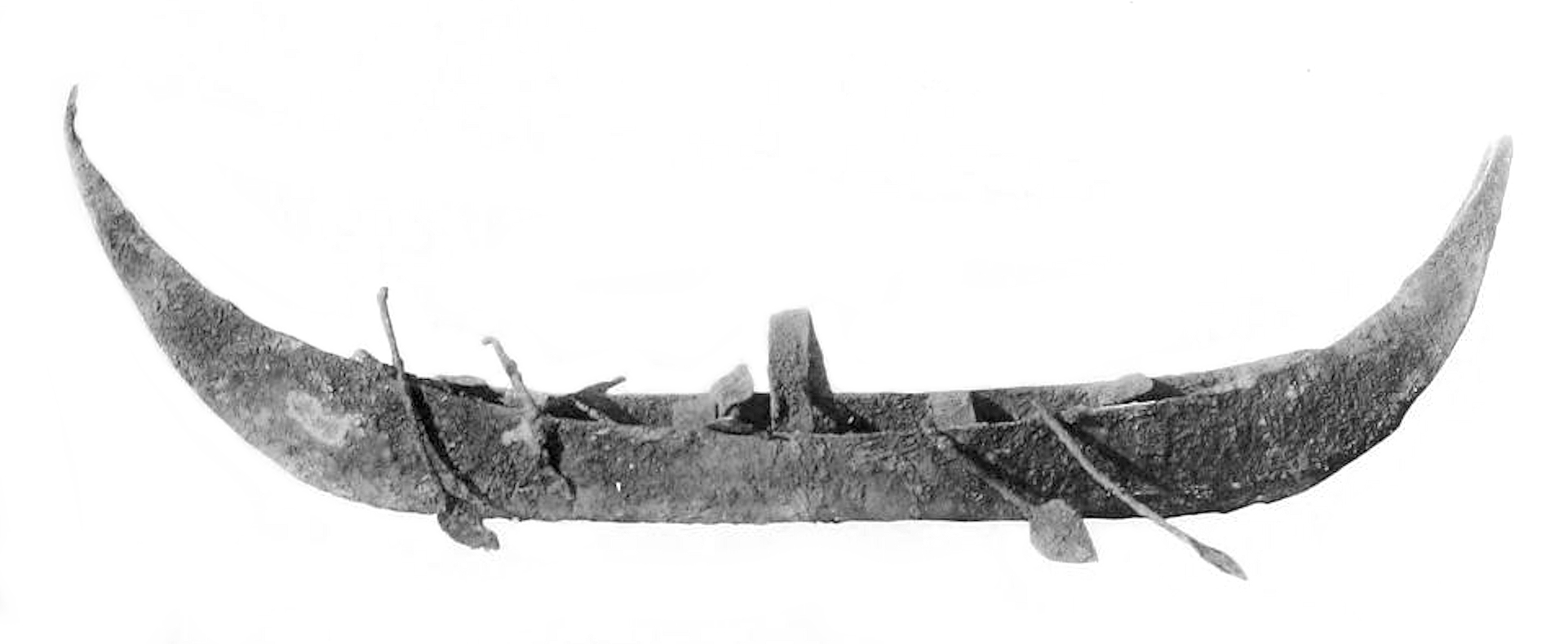
Silver model of a boat, tomb PG 789, 2600-2500 BCE

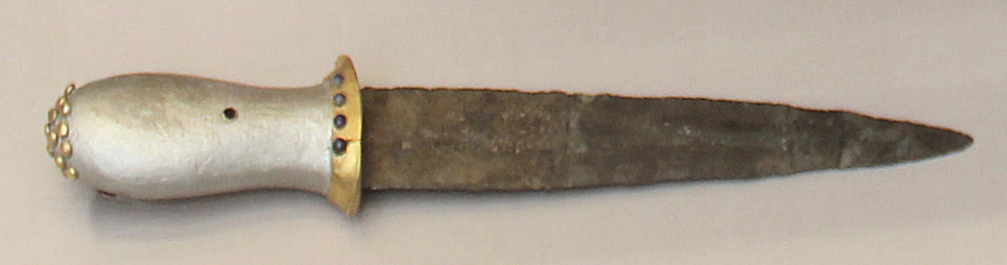
Knife from tomb PG 789

== See also ==
- Sumer
- History of Sumer
- Royal Cemetery at Ur
- Near Eastern archaeology
- Early and simple domes

== Sources ==
- Jane McIntosh: Ancient Mesopotamia. ABC-CLIO 2005, ISBN 1-57607-965-1, p. 73 (restricted online version (google books))
- Leonard Woolley: The Sumerians. p. 38 (restricted online version (google books))

Regnal titles
Preceded by Possibly Ur-Pabilsag	King of Ur c. 2550 BC	Succeeded by Possibly Akalamdug
