= Hebra =

Hebra may refer to:

- Hebra (gastropod), a genus of marine snail in the family Nassariidae
- a zebroid that is a crossing between a horse stallion and a zebra mare
- Ferdinand Ritter von Hebra, Austrian physician and dermatologist
