= Glenn M. Schwartz =

American archaeologist

- Born: Baltimore, Maryland, U.S.
- Education: Yale University (BA, PhD)
- Known for: Tell al-Raqa'i, Umm el-Marra, Kurd Qaburstan
- Awards: P. E. MacAllister Field Archaeology Award, G. Ernest Wright Book Award
- Scientific career
- Fields: Archaeology, Near Eastern Studies
- Workplaces: Johns Hopkins University
- Thesis: Excavations at Tell Leilan: Stratigraphy and Pottery of the Late Third Millennium B.C. (1983)
- Doctoral advisor: Harvey Weiss
- Website: Johns Hopkins Profile

Glenn M. Schwartz is an American archaeologist specializing in the archaeology of ancient Syria and Iraq. He is known for directing excavations at sites such as Umm el-Marra and Kurd Qaburstan and his contributions to the study of early urbanism, state formation, and collapse in the ancient Near East.

His work has resulted in an international reputation, particularly for discoveries at Umm el-Marra, such as elite burials provisioned with gold, silver, and lapis lazuli artifacts, now-extinct royal equids, and evidence of the world's oldest alphabetic script.

Schwartz is the Whiting Professor of Archaeology in the Department of Near Eastern Studies at the Johns Hopkins University.

== Early life and education ==
Schwartz is from the Mount Washington area of Baltimore, MD, and earned his B.A. in Archaeology from Yale University, graduating magna cum laude in 1976. He continued at Yale to complete an M.A. and M.Phil. in Near Eastern Languages and Civilizations in 1980, and a Ph.D. in 1982, supervised by Harvey Weiss. His dissertation focused on ceramic periodization at the archaeological site of Tell Leilan in Syria.

== Career ==
Since 1987, Schwartz has held appointments at the Johns Hopkins University, including Chair of the Department of Near Eastern Studies from 2012 to 2018. He has also held guest appointments at international institutions, such as the École Pratique des Hautes Études in Paris and the Free University of Berlin.

He has directed several prominent archaeological projects:

- Kurd Qaburstan, Iraq (2013–2022), the investigation of a second millennium BC urban center, identified with ancient Qabra.
- Umm el-Marra, Syria (1994–2010), exploring mortuary practices and spatial organization of a Bronze Age urban complex, identified with ancient Tuba.
- Tell al-Raqa'i, Syria (1986–1993), focusing on urban-rural dynamics in the third millennium BC.

== Research contributions ==
Schwartz's early investigations focused on the excavation of Tell al-Raqa'i, a small, rural settlement dating to the third millennium BC, to explore the dynamics of rural-urban relationships in ancient Syrian communities. Emphasizing the importance of viewing these societies as existing along a continuum between urban and rural, the research highlighted the economic, political, and cultural integration of rural communities with those of local urban centers, as well as their involvement in broader regional networks.

His next project shifted focus to investigate Umm el-Marra, a medium sized Bronze Age city located on the Jabbul Plain of Northern Syria. The research advanced the understanding of Early Bronze Age urbanism in Syria by focusing on a medium-sized city, offering a counterpoint to research at the largest contemporary cities such as Ebla, Mari, and Tell Brak. One of the more spectacular discoveries, the elite mortuary complex, provided rare and detailed evidence for the burial practices of one of Syria's earliest urban societies. Situated at the heart of the community, the complex contained human remains buried alongside luxury goods made of gold, silver, and lapis lazuli, as well as the elaborately arranged burials of both mundane and high-prestige animals. The kunga, a donkey-wild ass hybrid well-known from historical sources, was among the animals buried alongside elite individuals. The overall findings are unparalleled in third-millennium BC Syrian archaeology and illuminate the roles of ancestor veneration, social memory, and animal symbolism in shaping early urban communities.

When work at Umm el-Marra was interrupted in 2010 due to regional instability, Schwartz initiated a new project at Kurd Qaburstan, a 100-ha walled urban site dating to the second millennium BCE located on the Erbil Plain in the Kurdistan Region of Iraq. Research conducted from 2013 to 2022 significantly advanced the understanding of Bronze Age urbanism in northern Mesopotamia. Excavations revealed evidence of a compact Late Bronze Age occupation on the high mound as well as substantial Middle Bronze Age remains. Key discoveries from the Middle Bronze Age include monumental architecture, a temple in the lower town, and a monumental high mound building featuring mudbrick walls preserved up to 1.5 meters high. Geophysical surveys identified a densely occupied urban layout, including a city wall with towers at regular intervals, demonstrating that Kurd Qaburstan's lower town was densely occupied.

== Selected publications ==
Schwartz is the author and editor of numerous influential books and journal articles in the fields of Archaeology and Anthropology, including:

- The Archaeology of Syria: From Complex Hunter-Gatherers to Early Urban Societies, co-written with Peter Akkermans (2003).
- Sacred Killing: The Archaeology of Sacrifice in the Ancient Near East (2012), edited with Anne Porter.
- Rural Archaeology in Early Urban Northern Mesopotamia: Excavations at Tell al-Raqa'i, by Glenn Schwartz, with other contributors, winner of the 2017 ASOR G. Ernest Wright award.
- Animals and Ancestors: Ritual and Economy in the Ancient Near East (2022), by Glenn Schwartz, with other contributors, winner of the 2024 ASOR G. Ernest Wright award.

== Awards and honors ==
In addition to awards for his publications, Schwartz has received numerous grants and fellowships from organizations such as the National Science Foundation and the National Geographic Society.

In 2022, he was the recipient of P. E. MacAllister Field Archaeology Award, a lifetime achievement award given by the American Society of Overseas Research (ASOR) honoring archaeologists who make exceptional contributions to the field.
