= Partible (disambiguation) =

Partible may refer to the following:

- Van Partible, American animator (born 1971)
- Partible inheritance
- Partible paternity
