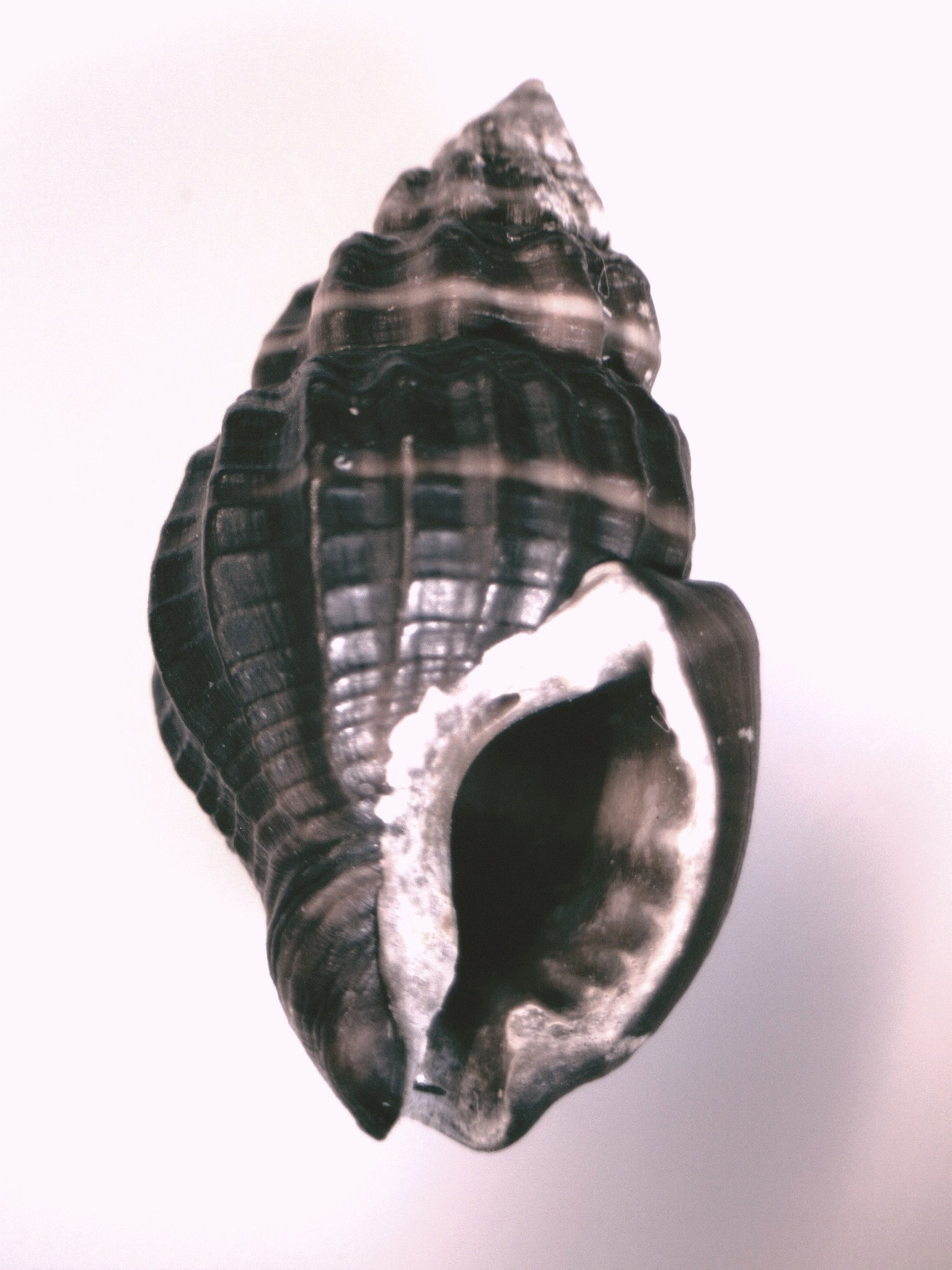
- Hebra nigra

Scientific classification
- Kingdom: Animalia
- Phylum: Mollusca
- Class: Gastropoda
- Subclass: Caenogastropoda
- Order: Neogastropoda
- Family: Nassariidae
- Genus: Hebra; A. Adams, 1853

Type species
- Buccinum muricatum Quoy & Gaimard, 1833

Synonyms
- Nassa (Hebra) H. Adams & A. Adams, 1853; Nassarius (Hebra) H. Adams & A. Adams, 1853; Scabronassa Peile, 1939

= Hebra (gastropod) =

Genus of gastropods

Hebra is a genus of sea snails, marine gastropod mollusks in the family Nassariidae, the Nassa mud snails or dog whelks.

This genus is unaccepted and is considered a synonym of Nassarius Duméril, 1805.

== Species ==
Species within the genus Hebra include:

- † Hebra junghuhni (K. Martin, 1895)
- † Hebra kondangensis (Oostingh, 1939)
- Hebra oberwimmeri (Preston, 1907)

Species brought into synonymy

- Hebra corticata (A. Adams, 1852): synonym of Hebra nigra (Hombron & Jacquinot, 1848)
- Hebra crenolirata (A. Adams, 1852): synonym of Nassarius crenoliratus (A. Adams, 1852)
- Hebra curta (Gould, 1850) : synonym of Hebra horrida (Dunker, 1847)
- Hebra horrida (Dunker, 1847) : synonym of Nassarius horridus (Dunker, 1847)
- Hebra nigra (Hombron & Jacquinot, 1848) : synonym of Nassarius nigrus (Hombron & Jacquinot, 1848)
- Hebra subspinosa (Lamarck, 1822) : synonym of Nassarius subspinosus (Lamarck, 1822)
