= Lord Morton's mare =

Equid hybrid notable in the history of evolutionary theory

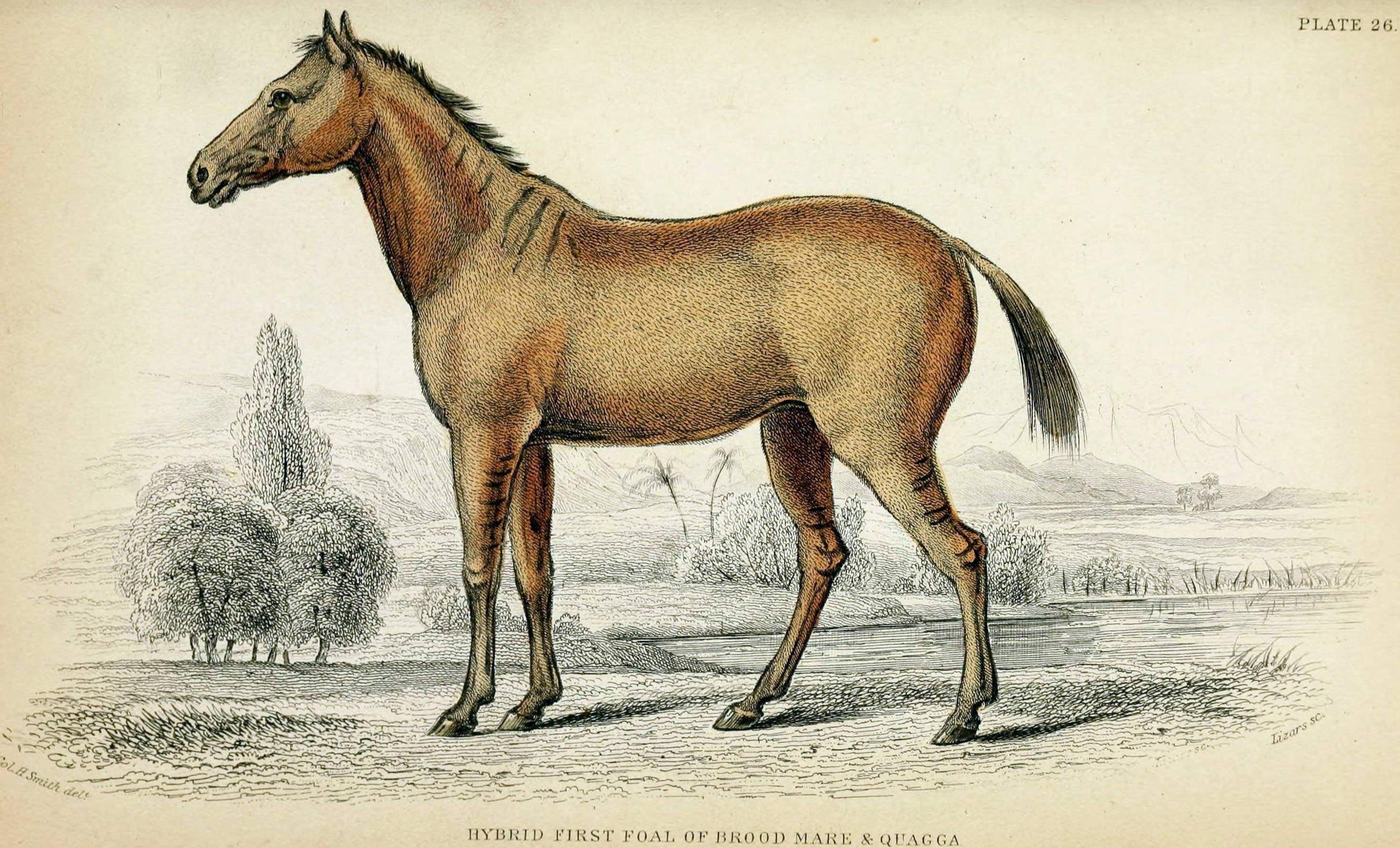
The first hybrid between the mare and the quagga

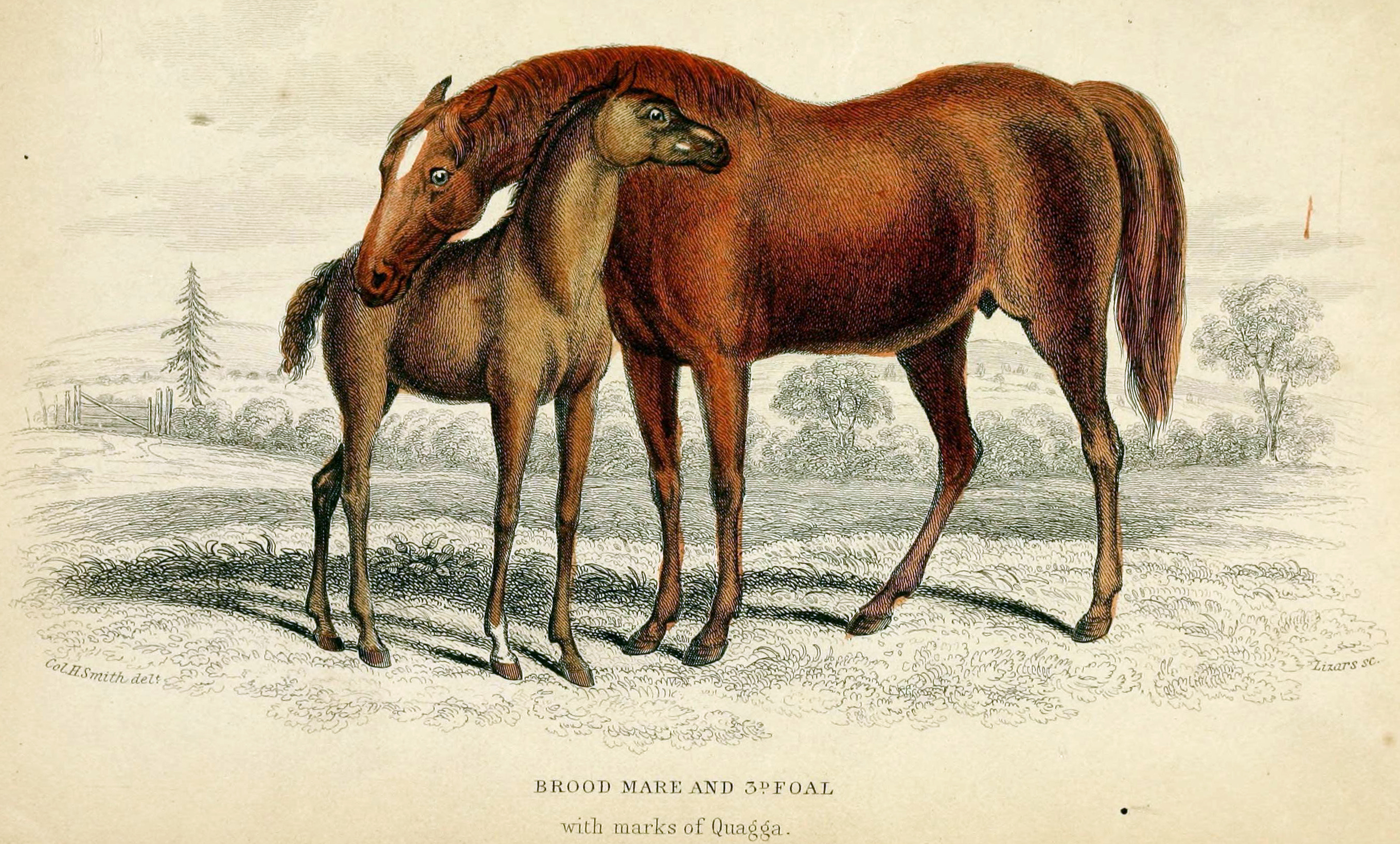
The mare with the subsequent foal

Lord Morton’s mare was an equid hybrid and once an often-noticed example in the history of evolutionary theory.

In 1820, George Douglas, 16th Earl of Morton, F.R.S., reported to the President of the Royal Society that, being desirous of domesticating the quagga (a now extinct subspecies of the plains zebra), he had bred an Arabian chestnut mare with a quagga stallion and that, subsequently, the same mare was bred with a black stallion and Lord Morton found that the offspring had strange stripes in the legs like the quagga. The Royal Society published Lord Morton's letter in its Philosophical Transactions, 1821. In the same issue "Particulars of a Fact, nearly similar to that related by Lord Morton, communicated to the President, in a letter from Daniel Giles, Esq." reported that in a litter of a black and white sow, by a "boar of the wild breed, the chestnut colour of the boar strongly prevailed" in some of the piglets, even to the two subsequent litters of that sow.

These circumstantial reports seemed to confirm the ancient idea of telegony in heritability: Charles Darwin cited the example in On the Origin of Species (1859) and The Variation of Animals and Plants Under Domestication (1868). The concept of telegony, that the seed of a male could continue to affect the offspring of a female, whether animal or human, had been inherited from Aristotle and remained a legitimate theory until experiments in the 1890s confirmed Mendelian inheritance. Biologists now explain the phenomenon of Lord Morton's mare as the result of dominant and recessive alleles. The mare and black stallion each carried genes for the striped markings on the foal, but the markings were hidden in the parent animals by dominant genes for normal color. Striped "primitive markings" are in fact commonly seen in domesticated horses, particularly those with a dun coat color.

== See also ==
- Zebroid
