= Equine hybrid =

Hybrids created from the horse genus Equus

Equine hybrids are hybrids created from crossing different members of the genus Equus, such as a horse, donkey and zebra.

== History ==
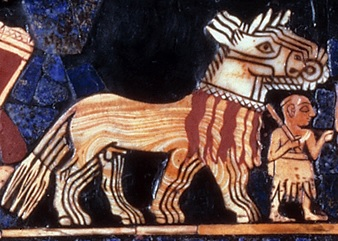
Depiction of the kunga, an equine hybrid, from the 3rd millennium BCE, depicted by the Standard of Ur mozaic.

Hybrid equines have been created since ancient times. As early as the 3rd millennium BC, Mesopotamians crossbred the domestic donkey with the now-extinct Syrian wild ass to produce a hybrid known as a kunga. Horse-donkey hybrids (the mule and hinny) are also of ancient vintage, as evidenced by their presence in works such as the Iliad and the Hebrew Bible.

Zebroids are known from more recent times; in 1820, George Douglas, 16th Earl of Morton hybridized a domestic horse with a quagga (see Lord Morton's mare).

From the 20th century on, a greater diversity of equine hybrids have been created, beginning with the crossbreeding of zebras and donkeys. Equine hybrids can be traced back to Africa where there are vast amount of equine species which resulted in natural crossing, creating hybrid species. These hybrids were found to be more efficient than the original species because they possess certain traits of both species, so scientists began to experiment by crossing other species of horse family and categorizing them as equine hybrids. Equine hybrids are now bred commercially. Mules bred from mammoth studs and stock or draft mares can be as large as 17 hands and are as strong as a normal horse. Other mules are bred for pets or for entertainment such as zoos; these are the miniature horses or miniature donkeys.

== Nomenclature ==
Hybrids are named based on the sex and species of the parents. Hybrids are typically given a portmanteau name, combining the first half of the father’s name and the second half of the mother's name. For example, the cross between a male zebra and a female horse is a zorse. A cross between a male zebra and a female donkey is a zonkey.

Horse-donkey crosses are an exception to this naming convention. A mule is the cross between female horse and male donkey. A hinny is the cross of male horse and female donkey; mules and hinnies are reciprocal hybrids.

	Horse ♀	Donkey ♀	Zebra ♀
Horse ♂	Horse (E. ferus)	Hinny	Many terms incl. "hebra"
Donkey ♂	Mule	Donkey (E. africanus)	Many terms incl. "donkra"
Zebra ♂	Many terms incl. "zorse"	Many terms incl. "zonkey"	Zebra (3 species)

=== Zebroid ===
- A male zebra and a female donkey creates a zonkey
- A male zebra and a female horse creates a zorse
- A male zebra and a female pony creates a zony or, if a female Shetland pony, a Zetland
- A male donkey and a female zebra creates a donkra
- A male horse and a female zebra creates a hebra
- An extinct quagga and a horse created a Lord Morton's mare
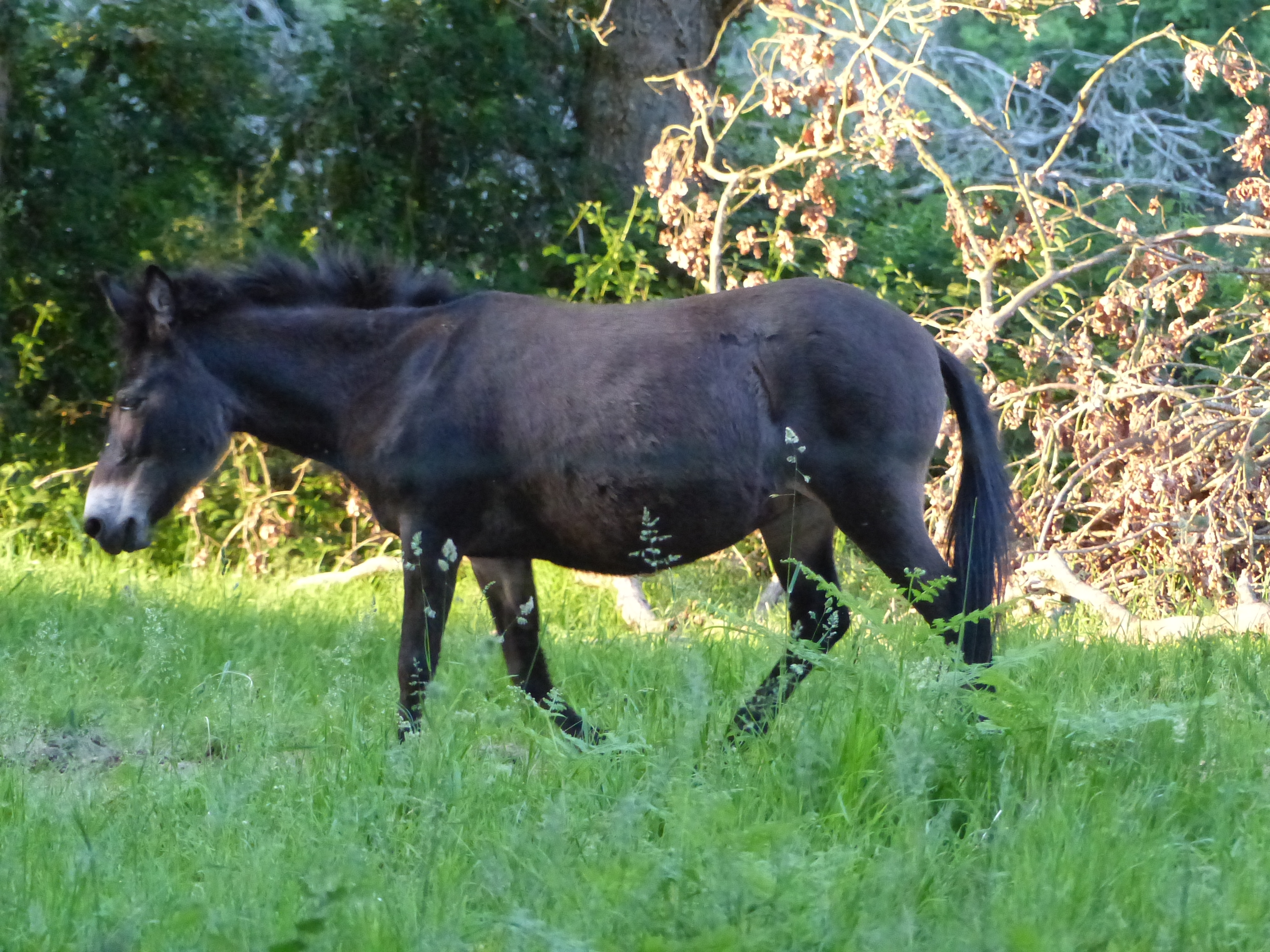
Hinny

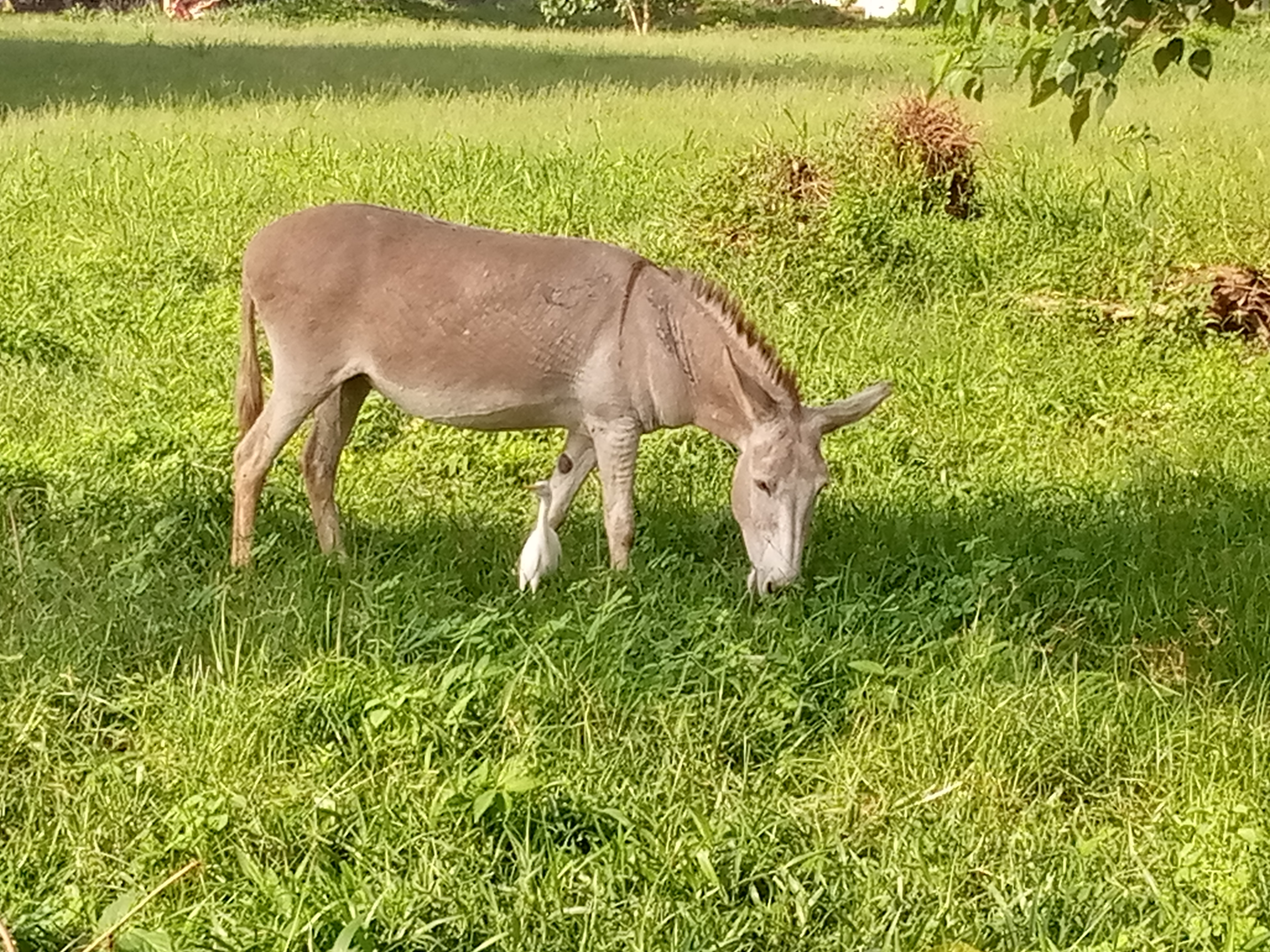
Mule

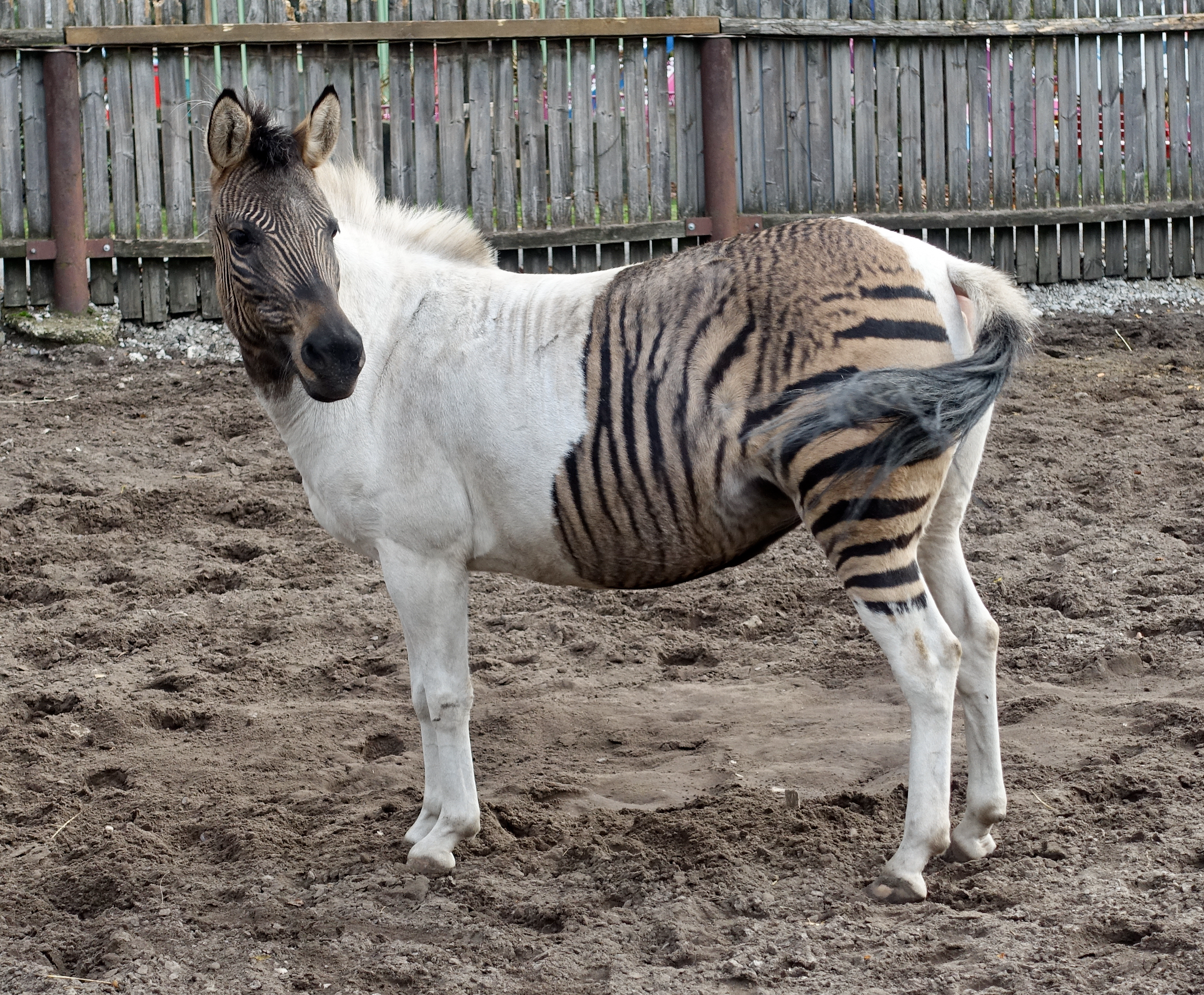
Hebra

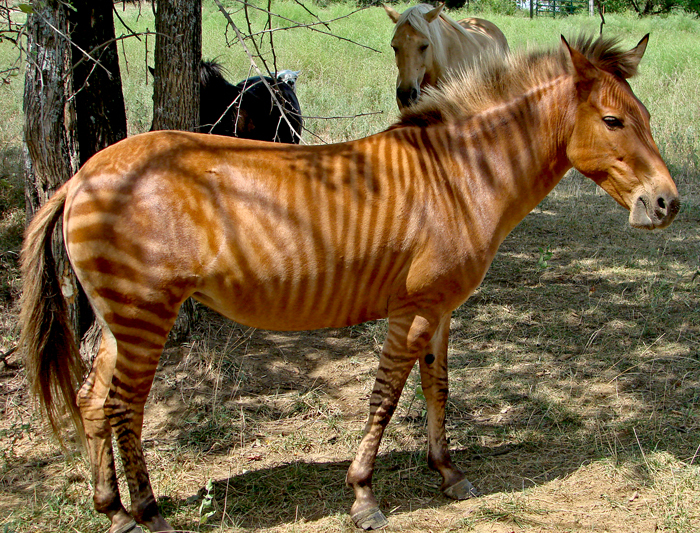
Zorse

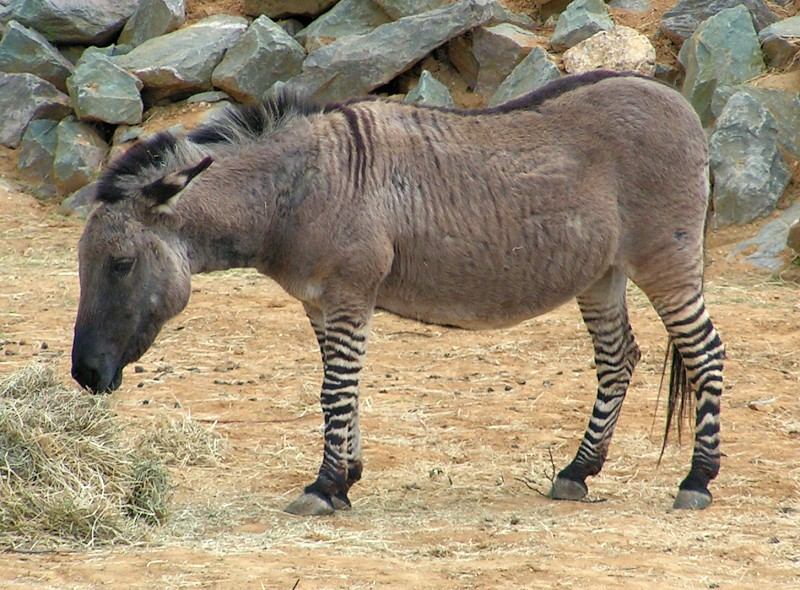
Zonkey

== Nature of the animals ==
Zebras are usually wild animals. However, when they are raised with other domestic horses, they are tame enough to be ridden draught. Mules are smaller, more resistant to heat and exhaustion and much stronger. Horses are much larger, but likely to suffer from exhaustion and heat.

=== Fertility of equine hybrids ===
Male mules (johns) are sterile, but fertile female mules (mollies) sometimes occur.

The different number and different structure in chromosomes makes it difficult for them to pair up properly. Donkeys have 62 chromosomes and horses have 64, so their hybrids (mules and hinnies) have 63. Zebras have between 32 and 46 (depending on the species) and their hybrids are sterile and infertile.

It is harder to cross species if the female has fewer chromosomes than the males, as in the crossing of a stallion and a jenny (female donkey); this results in minimal breeding of hinnies.

Natural hybrids between the three zebra species, the Grévy's zebra, the Mountain zebra, and the Plains zebra have also occurred in the wild, particularly in central Kenya where they have their ranges overlap with each other, sometimes resulting from a scarcity of mates for the endangered Grévy's species and have produced fertile hybrid offspring. These hybrids often display behaviors intermediate between the three species, such as increased vigilance and altered herd social structures. Hybridization poses a conservation risk to endangered species like the Grévy's zebra, as it can lead to genetic dilution.

Although Przewalski's horses have 66 chromosomes, they are able to breed with domestic horses. The hybrid offspring, which have 65 chromosomes, are fertile and able to reproduce, unlike other hybrid members of the family. Captive breeding programs and reintroduction efforts have helped save Przewalski's horses from extinction, with some hybrids being also used in efforts are being made to maintain the genetic diversity of the Przewalski's horse population.

=== Conditions ===
Mules are more tolerant to heat than horses; horses are more efficient in cold weather. Mules, like donkeys, are more effective in deserts. Horses are more likely to suffer from exhaustion compared to mules. While mules are relatively slower than horses, they are much safer to ride. Mules consume less food than horses, and can live longer.

== See also ==
- Hybrid (biology)
- Equidae
- Equinae
