= Peter Akkermans =

Dutch archaeologist

Peter M. M. G. Akkermans (born Hulsberg, 14 November 1957) is a Dutch archaeologist and emeritus Professor of Ancient Near Eastern archaeology at Leiden University.

Akkermans was awarded his doctorate for work on the late Neolithic period in Syria. He was a curator at the Netherlands National Museum of Antiquities between 1990 and 2009 and has directed and been involved with excavations in Syria, Turkey, Germany and Bulgaria. His most important work has been on the Pre-pottery Neolithic B, Neolithic, Halaf and Bronze Age site of Tell Sabi Abyad, including surveys of the Balikh Valley area in northern Syria. He published an extensive compilation of Syria's archaeology with Glenn M. Schwartz in 2003 titled The Archaeology of Syria.
