= Umm el-Marra =

Village in Syria

- أم المرة (Arabic)
- Location within Syria
- 36.133791°N 37.693819°E
- Location: Aleppo Governorate, Syria

Site notes
- Area: 25 ha (62 acres)
- Excavation dates: 1978-1985, 1994-2010
- Archaeologists: Roland Tefnin, Glenn Schwartz, Hans Curvers

Umm el-Marra (also Oumm el-Marra and Tall Umm al-Marra), (Arabic: أم المرة), east of modern Aleppo in the Jabbul Plain of Aleppo Governorate Syria, was one of the ancient Near East's oldest cities, located on a crossroads of two trade routes northwest of Ebla, in a landscape that was much more fertile than it is today.

== Tuba ==
It has been suggested that in the Late Bronze Age the name of the site was Tuba (or Tupa) possibly mentioned in Egyptian inscriptions listing cities that were defeated or destroyed in the Pharaoh Thutmose III's north Syrian campaign. The city of Tuba is also mentioned in epigraphic remains from Ebla, Mari, and Alalakh. In Ebla it is written as Dub or Tub. This suggestion is as yet unproven. One ruler, Sumi-rapa (son of a Yarlm-Lim), is known from a seal found at Alalakh. He is thought to have been a contemporary of Alalakh ruler Niqmepa, a vassal of Mitanni. Two different translations of the seal have been proposed "Adad who appointed me, Sin(?) who loves my reign, Sumirapa, son of Iarim-Lim, king of Tuba, beloved of Istar, seal of seals " and "Adad who proclaimed my name, the .... who loves my reign: Sumi-rapa, son of Iarim-Lim, king of Tuba, beloved of Istar, seal of .... s". The seal iconography is "Winged sun disk hovering over a Syrian prince with tall oval headdress and draped garment with thickened borders being blessed by an Egyptian-type falcon-headed god and the Syrian goddess". It is known that "Istar of Tuba", an epithet of the goddess Ištar, was worshiped at Tuba from texts found at Mari. Siptu, Queen of Mari ruler Zimri-Lim made a sappum sacrifice to Istar of Tuba and on several occasions made offerings to the lance, the divine weapon, of Ištar of Tuba.

Doubts have been raised about the identification os Umm el-Marra with Tuba, placing it instead closer to Alalakh. Doubts have also been raised that the Tub or Dub in the Ebla texts refers to the city of Tuba in question. The other problem with identifying Umm el-Marra as Tuba is that Tuba had rulers and a god (Istar of Tuba) so there had to be a palace and at least one temple and there have been no archaeological findings for either one of those.

== History ==
=== Early Bronze ===
Umm el-Marra VI: In the Early Bronze III (c. 2750/2700-2350 BC), Umm el-Marra was an important hub with about 3000-5000 inhabitants. At the beginning of this period, the region was wetter than today, but by 2500 BC climate became gradually drier.

==== Ebla Period ====
Umm el-Marra V-IV: In the Early Bronze IV (c. 2350-2000 BC), the dry climate intensified and cities on the Jabbul Plain experienced a collapse of central authority between 2200 and 2000 BC (4.2 ka event). A possible explanation may lie in the effects of sustained drought on overstressed primitive agriculture. Dr. Glenn Schwartz of Johns Hopkins, who conducted field archaeology at Umm el-Marra, suggested in 1994 that "they placed extensive demands on their environments, continually intensifying their agriculture to feed more people. The added stress from a few dry years may have been the straw that broke the camel's back." Level V contains Tomb 1 with pottery similar to Mardikh IIB1 Ebla Palace G.

=== Middle Bronze ===
Umm el-Marra Level IIId: In the Transitional EB IV-MB I, the site was never completely abandoned. Thus, this region saw some continuation as opposed to a collapse following the severe drought conditions that had prevailed. In the MB I (c. 2000-1820 BC) it gradually recovered.

==== Yamhad Period ====
Umm el-Marra Levels IIIa-c: In the MB IIA (c. 1820 BC), the city saw a renaissance while controlled by the Amorites. At this time, it became a regional capital subject to the Great Kingdom of Yamkhad centered on Aleppo. A series of public works saw the construction of ramparts with a mudbrick city wall.

=== Late Bronze ===
==== Mitanni Period ====
During the Late Bronze, the site was under the control of various powers. It would at one point have been under the Mitanni Empire, and Thutmose III of Egypt might have campaigned in the area.

==== Hittite Period ====
Following the military campaigns of Suppiluliuma I, it became part of the Hittite Empire following the Fall of Carchemish and the death of Tushratta of Mitanni around 1345 BC. The site was destroyed in the 14th century BC.

The Late Bronze Age collapse saw the city completely abandoned by 1200/1190 BC.

=== Classical Period ===
After a long period of abandonment, the site was re-occupied in the Hellenistic and Roman periods.

== Archaeology ==
The site covers around 25 hectares with a maximum height of about 10 meters. It was surrounded with a city wall, about 400 meters in diameter, with 3 gates and a defensive ditch. The acropolis, a quadrilateral with rounded corners like the city wall, at the top of the mound has a diameter of about 100 meters. Excavation of Umm el-Marra was conducted at the site between 1978 and 1985 by a Belgian team led by Roland Tefnin. This team also worked at the nearby site of Tell Abou Dann.

From 1994 until 2010, a joint archaeological team from the Johns Hopkins University and the University of Amsterdam led by Glenn M. Schwartz and Hans Curvers worked at Umm el-Marra.

Finds included a cuneiform tablet (UEM T1), recovered from the North Area near the city wall in a Late Bronze Age (Umm el-Marra period II) layer. The text is a contract document (release of a slave woman) "in the presence of Šuttarna, the king". Šuttarna (c. 1400-1380 BC) was ruler of the Mitanni empire. The tablet was sealed with the seal of an earlier Mitanni ruler Šauštatar. The paleography and syllabary of the text is similar to texts from that period found at Tell Brak

=== 3rd millennium tomb ===
A rare intact, unlooted tomb, ca. 2300 BC, uncovered by Dr. Schwartz's team in 2000 at the site, made science press headlines, for it contained five richly-adorned adults and three babies, some of whom were ornamented head-to-toe in gold and silver.

It may be the oldest intact possibly royal tomb yet to be found in Syria. Dr. Schwartz noted of peculiar aspects in the burial that they 'may hint at ritual characteristics, rather than a tomb simply reserved for royalty or elite individuals.' The interment, which was above ground in ancient times, included three layers of skeletons in wooden coffins lined with textiles. The top layer includes traces of two coffins, each containing a young woman in her twenties and a baby. The women were the most richly ornamented of all the occupants of the tomb, with jewelry of silver, gold and lapis lazuli. Also of interest on this level was an accompanying lump of iron, possibly from a meteorite. Geochemical analysis of the iron, based on the ratio of iron to nickel and cobalt, confirms that the iron was meteoritic in origin. One of the babies appeared to be wearing a bronze torque, or collar.

In the layer below were coffins of two adult males and the remains of a baby at some distance from both men, close to the entrance of the tomb. This differs from the placement of the babies in the upper layer, where they were placed next to the women's bodies. Crowning the older man was a silver diadem decorated with a disk bearing a rosette motif, while the man opposite had a bronze dagger. The third and lowest layer held an adult male with a silver cup and silver pins.

All the individuals were accompanied by scores of ceramic vessels, some of which contained animal bones that may have been part of funerary animal offerings. Outside the tomb to the south, against the tomb wall, was a jar containing the remains of a baby, a spouted jar, and two skulls, horselike but apparently belonging neither to horses or donkeys. These equids were subsequently identified as kunga, a hybrid of domestic donkey and wild ass. Two groups of three puppies were found (Installation B) and the skeleton of an adult dog (Installation C) was found between equids.

Incisions on four lightly baked fragmentary clay cylinders dated to c. 2350 BC have been hypothesized to be Early Alphabetic Semitic writing, which would make them the oldest such examples. Some of the fragments were joined to bame 4 partial cylinders (UMM04 O-3 a-d) and no further joins were possible. The find layer was dated to Early Bronze IVA (c. 2350 BC) however there was an intrusive Late Bronze pit dug into that area of the tomb, which the excavators discounted.

== See also ==
- List of cities of the ancient Near East
- List of Mesopotamian dynasties
- List of Mesopotamian deities
