= Kurd Qaburstan =

Archaeological site in Iraq

- Location within Iraq
- 35°59′24″N 43°51′36″E
- Type: settlement
- Periods: Bronze Age, Islamic
- Location: Erbil Governorate, Iraq

History
- Built: 3rd millennium BC

Site notes
- Excavation dates: 2013 to present
- Archaeologists: Glenn M. Schwartz, Andrew Creekmore, Tiffany Earley-Spadoni
- Condition: Ruined
- Owner: Public
- Public access: Yes
- Website: https://projects.cah.ucf.edu/kq/

Kurd Qaburstan, is an ancient Near East archaeological site in the Erbil Governorate, in the Kurdistan Region of Iraq, 22 kilometers southwest of Erbil. It is considered one of the most important archaeological sites in the region. The site is strategically located between the Upper and Lower Zab rivers. The modern village of Yedi Kizlar is adjacent to and covers a portion of the southeastern lower town. The site is primarily a single-period site dating to the early 2nd millennium BC, the Middle Bronze Age (contemporaneous with the historical Old Babylonian period). There is also a compact Late Bronze Age occupation on the high mound (possibly Mitanni-related). Kurd Qaburstan has been proposed as the location of the ancient city of Qabra. The site is located near Tell Halawa, Tell Aliawa, Tell Baqrta, and Qasr Shemamok (Kilizi), other prominent sites on the Erbil plain.

== Archaeology ==
A regional survey by the Erbil Plain Archaeological Survey led by Jason Ur of the Harvard University identified the location (Site 31, Kurd Qaburstan, UTM 397479 E/3983250 N) from satellite imagery and examination of the site. From the 1960's CORONA image it appeared to be a large walled city. The 11 hectare central mound (with a modern cemetery at its highest point) is 17 meters in height with a lower town rising about 3 meters above the plain. The site has an area of around 100 hectares and the surrounding city wall (encompassing 105 hectares) is preserved to the height of between 1 and 3 meters and had bastions every 20 meters. The wall thickness ranged from 3.3 meters wide in the west to 5.3-7.6 meters wide in the north and the bastions were about 8 meters wide.

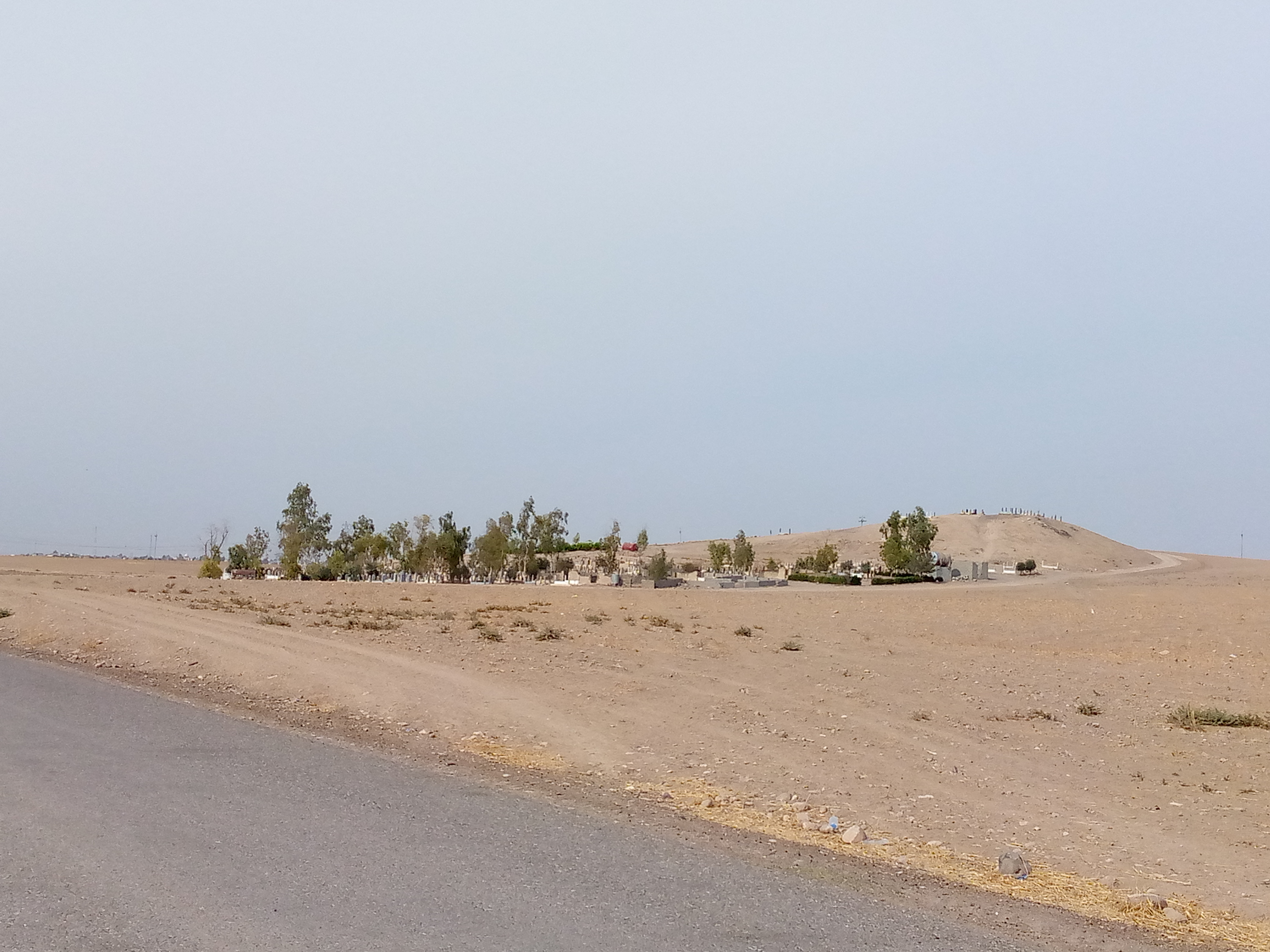
Kurd Qaburstan

Excavation field seasons by a Johns Hopkins University team led by Glenn M. Schwartz and geophysics survey led by Andrew Creekmore of the University of Northern Colorado have been held in 2013, 2014, 2017, and 2022 (with a study season in 2016). In 2013 a geophysical survey was begun and seven small (6 x 10 meters) sample sections were opened. Mitanni era remains were found on the upper mound and middle Islamic remains in the lower town and the city wall was confirmed. In 2014, the geophysical survey was continued (totaling 30 hectares by seasons end) augmented by surface sherd collection. The geophysical survey showed well ordered streets and neighborhoods in the lower town, within the wall. Five trenches on the upper mound found three phases of Mitanni occupation including a cylinder seal. A trench in the lower town found Middle Bronze residential occupation. A trench on the south slope of the upper mound revealed two Middle Bronze phases with the lower firmly Old Babylonian period. A Neo-Babylonian era grave (with "stamp seals, a cylinder seal, bronze toggle pins, and a bronze fibula") was also excavated there. In 2017, continued work in the lower town showed that the Middle Bronze construction was bedded on virgin soil at a depth of 3 meters showing that the lower town was first occupied then. Continued geophysical work located a monumental Middle Bronze temple in the lower town which was confirmed by test excavation. In 2022 a 19 x 4 meter trench was excavated on the high mound north slope on a large Middle Bronze building showing signs of having been burnt. Three 10 meter by 10 meter trenches were begun in the eastern lower town. Continued magnetometry showed a large structure in the northern lower town, possible a palace.

Radiocarbon dates have now been obtained for four Middle Bronze Age stratified samples, three in the upper town and one in the lower town, resulting in a calibrated date range of c. 1875–1745 BC with the MBA destruction being dated c. 1805–1733 BC. Eight samples were obtained from the Late Bronze Age, all in the upper town. For the three phases of LBA occupation, dates were obtained of c. 1538–1505 BC for Phase three, with Phase two beginning c. 1512–1491 BC and ending c. 1501–1479 BC, and with Phase One beginning c. 1489–1463 BC and ending c. 1475–1435 BC. The data suggests a two century abandonment between the MBA destruction and the Mitanni re-occupation.

Since 2024, the site has been excavated by a University of Central Florida team led by Tiffany Earley-Spadoni. The NSF funded project investigates the social processes that led to the rapid growth of the Middle Bronze Age city. Results from the 2024 season confirm the presence of a lower-town palace based upon well-preserved monumental architecture and evidence for administrative activities such as cylinder sealings, a game board, and three cuneiform tablets. Excavations in a residential district northwest of the high mound also revealed glimpses of everyday life in the ancient northern Mesopotamian city. One of the tablets was found in a destruction deposit along with burned materials, building rubble, and human remains. The other two tablets were found in an administrative context alongside cylinder sealings and storage vessels bearing identical pre-fired pot marks.

In 2025 excavations in the destroyed Lower Town East (LTE) Palace revealed extensive and rare evidence for siege warfare in the Middle Bronze Age, and the magnetometer survey of the area inside the city walls, begun in 2014, was completed. In the LTE Palace, archaeologists determined that there had been two distinct destruction events. Finds included more than 100 clay sealings and twenty cuneiform tablets. The tablets were mainly of an administrative nature and at least three were datable within a few days of one another, with the dates of the first of the two destruction events matching historical events known from the Stele of Dadusha. Another tablet, a letter, was written by a high official known to have been operating at Qabra, further supporting the identification of the site with this ancient city. Remote sensing work revealed another portion of the massive citywide outer wall, which the excavators report matches the depiction from the Stele of Dadusha. Work also continued in the northwest neighborhoods and a small sondage was conducted on the high mound. Taken together the 2024 and 2025 excavation seasons reveal evidence of the LTE palace's destruction, matching the historical records, including 17 skeletons interred in the rubble.

The 2024/2025 tablets, most of which were unfired/air dried, have undergone professional conservation and remain in the collection of the Erbil Civilization Museum.

== History ==
The upper mound of Kurd Qaburstan was first occupied early in the 3rd millennium BC. Occupation spread to the lower town early in the 2nd millennium BC (Middle Bronze Age) and the city reached its maximum extent during the Old Babylonian period and into the Mitanni period (Middle Bronze to early Late Bronze Age). During the Late Bronze Age occupation retreated to the high mound and the northeastern lower town. Afterward, occupation was very light and restricted to the upper mound through the Sassanian period.

=== Qabra (Qabara) ===
It has been proposed that the site is the location of Qabra, known from Old Babylonian period texts. Qabra is not recorded before or after and it is assumed that it was known by that name for only a short time. It is known that Qabra was attacked by a coalition of Ekallatum, under Shamshi-Adad I (c. 1808–1776 BC) and Eshnunna, under Dadusha (c. 1800–1779 BC) and then occupied by Kingdom of Upper Mesopotamia ruler Shamshi-Adad I (after a long siege) and afterward his son Ishme-Dagan, Shamshi-Adad I having died roughly five years after the fall of Qabra. Both Dadusha and Ishme-Dagan claimed the use of tunneling to destroy the city walls of Qabra. For its part Eshnunna received the "spoils" of the city. A year name of Dadusha reads "Year Dadusza seized Qabarum". Then, after a brief period of independence under ruler Ardigandi it fell to the city of Kakmum under its ruler Gurgurrum. Gurgurrum is also mentioned in the texts of Eshnunna ruler Ilūni. The primary sources of this knowledge are from the Stele of Dadusha, Stele of Shamshi-Adad (in the Louvre), texts from Mari, and texts from Shemshara. In particular a text from Mari reading:

"To our lord speak! Your servants Ibal-Pi-El and Buqaqum (say), “We [arrived] in [the city of ] Assur at bedtime and [heard] the following word from those around us: ‘Kakmum defeated Ardigandi, the [king of ] Qabra.’ This we heard from those around us. We arrived [in Ekallatum], and Isme-Dagan [spoke to us] as follows: He (said), ‘5 hundred troops of Gur-gurrum attacked [the land] of Ardigandi and looted [its villages]. 2 thousand troops of Ardi-gandi went out to the rescue and fought, and Kakmu went ahead and defeated Ardigandi. And his (Ardigandi’s) high-ranking servants were running about aimlessly. Now that man, from cause of having been defeated, [will]. And he will pay attention to your lord (Zimri-Lim)."

A fragmentary stele (A0 2776) of unknown provenance is held in the Louvre Museum. From the Old Babylonian period it is thought to be of Shamshi-Adad I though that is not certain. It reads "... month of Addar, on its 20th day I crossed the Za'ibum and invaded the country Qabra. That country, its harvest I smote ...". The stele does not state that Qabra itself was conquered.

== See also ==
- Cities of the ancient Near East
- The archaeological hills in Erbil
