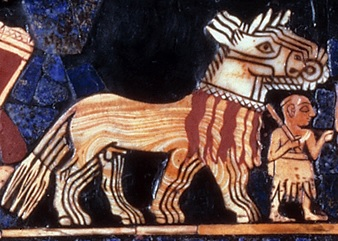

Scientific classification
- Kingdom: Animalia
- Phylum: Chordata
- Class: Mammalia
- Order: Perissodactyla
- Family: Equidae
- Subtribe: Equina
- Genus: Equus
- Species: E. hemionus hemippus♂ × E. africanus asinus♀

= Kunga (equid) =

Offspring of a male Syrian wild ass and a female donkey bred in ancient Middle East

The kunga was a hybrid equid that was used as a draft animal in ancient Syria and Mesopotamia, where it also served as an economic and political status symbol. Cuneiform writings from as early as the mid-third millennium BCE describe the animal as a hybrid but do not provide the precise taxonomical nature of the breeding that produced it. Modern paleogenomics has revealed it to have been the offspring of a female domesticated donkey and a wild male Syrian wild ass (a subspecies of onager). They fell out of favor after the introduction of domesticated horses and mules into the region at the end of the 3rd millennium BCE.

== Elite equids ==
Third-millennium BCE cuneiform from the kingdom of Ebla and the Mesopotamian region of Diyala name several types of equids (ANŠE, 𒀲), including one specified as the kúnga (ANŠE BAR.AN, 𒀲𒁇𒀭), which appear between about 2600 and 2000 BCE. These expensive animals, highly valued by the elite, were purpose-bred at Nagar, the rulers of which used them themselves and monopolized their production for distribution in the region. Records from Ebla report repeated expensive purchases of kunga equids from Nagar, and it was apparently in relation to this trade that the 'high superintendents of charioteers' and those responsible for maintaining the Ebla kunga herd traveled to Nagar. The Ebla king gave them as gifts to other rulers. It has been suggested that the kunga trade was central to the economies of the region's kingdoms, and that the ostentatious display of such expensive animals in official art directly associated them with kingship and power. A pair of seals from the period, including one from Nagar, depict equids with gods in the divine realm.

== Hybrid nature ==
Contemporary descriptions of the production of the kunga seem to indicate that they were hybrids, and there are indications that, like most hybrid equids, they were sterile. For example, foals are described in nursery herds with adult donkeys or onagers and donkey foals, never with kunga parents. Production would thus have been an intensive process: they would not have established a domesticated line, but rather each individual kunga had to be produced de novo by breeding two parental species anew, without the opportunity for improvement through selective breeding. Likewise, the necessity of repeated purchase of new animals from their limited production centers to maintain a stable of kunga suggests they could not be bred.

== Depictions ==
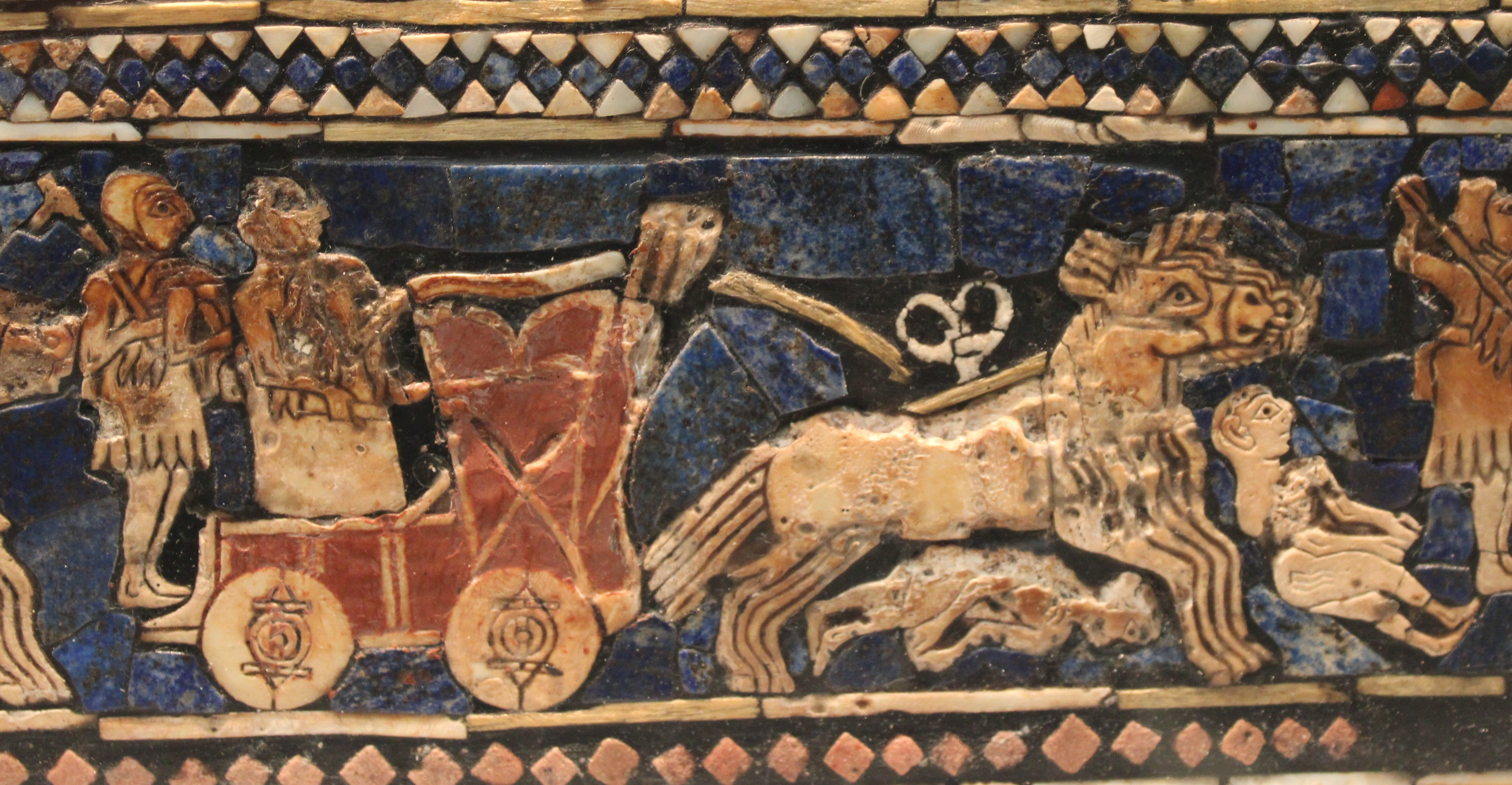
Detail from 'War' panel of the Standard of Ur mosaic, ca. 2600 BCE, showing a four-wheeled war wagon pulled by equids harnessed with a rein ring and a ring through the upper lip.

Kungas were used as draft animals, with smaller males and females used for pulling plows, while 'superior' males are described in more ceremonial and martial roles, pulling the four-wheeled war wagons and chariots of kings and gods. Equids appear in this role in official imagery such as the ca. 2600 BCE Standard of Ur mosaic and numerous surviving seals, while a rein ring similar to those depicted in the mosaic has been found at Ur, decorated with an equid. These depictions are likely kunga rather than donkeys, which appear only in lesser roles in descriptions. Illustrations appear to show the draft team of equids being controlled by strings passed through rings placed in the equids' upper lips. Their appearance in formal administrative cuneiform and official art seems to parallel the contemporary development of kingships in the region, suggesting a propagandistic association of the kunga with royalty.

== Archaeology and paleogenomics ==
They are known to have been used for funerary purposes, as demonstrated by high-status-funeral disbursement records for harnesses, and they have been identified with more than 40 equids that were sacrificed and ceremonially buried in elite graves at Umm el-Marra, Syria, in separate chambers from the burials of adult humans but many accompanied by human infants with signs of having been sacrificed. These buried kunga may have been intended either as offerings to deities, or as companions of the buried human elites, while such burials may also have served a legitimizing role for the royal lines and elite, with sacrificed 'royal' equids serving as analogs of human royals. Like the 'superior' kunga of cuneiform, these equids were all male, ranging in size from 1.19 m to 1.36 m. There are inherent challenges in identifying the species of equid skeletons, but the Umm el-Marra equids shared signs of domestication such as bit wear and evidence of foddering rather than grazing. They had a prominent overbite, while their bones had a combination of onager and donkey characteristics, being sized more like the former, but with the greater robustness of the latter, as might be expected in a hybrid between the two equid species. Such a hybrid would have been stronger and faster than the donkey, while less intractable to taming than the Syrian wild ass. Their hypothesized taxonomic identity was proven by a genomic analysis reported in 2022 that compared genomes from several of these skeletons with those of extant and extinct equids, and concluded that all of the Umm el-Marra skeletons were F1 hybrid progeny of captured male Syrian wild asses with female domesticated donkeys (jenny). These results make the kunga the earliest known human-engineered hybrid animal, predating the earliest mule by about 1500 years. The preference for a jenny over a jack (male) as the donkey parent represents a conscious choice to have the more tractable domestic species as the maternal parent for simpler husbandry. That all tested individuals were F1 hybrids reinforces the likelihood that kungas were sterile.

== Fate ==
Though the kunga held its elite status for half a millennium, it would be supplanted by both domestic horses (ANŠE.KUR.RA, 𒀲𒆳𒊏) and their donkey hybrid, the mule, introduced to the region at the end of the third millennium BCE and after that time seen filling the roles previously occupied by the kunga, which rapidly disappear from the historical record. A similar hybrid was reportedly produced at the London Zoo in 1883, but the subsequent extinction of the Syrian wild ass makes it impossible now to reproduce the kunga's precise taxonomic cross.
