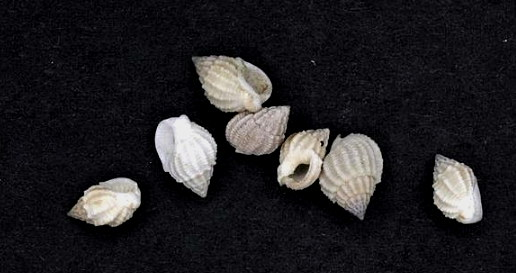
- A collection of shells of Nassarius horridus (museum specimens at Naturalis Biodiversity Center)

Scientific classification
- Kingdom: Animalia
- Phylum: Mollusca
- Class: Gastropoda
- Subclass: Caenogastropoda
- Order: Neogastropoda
- Family: Nassariidae
- Genus: Nassarius
- Species: N. horridus

Binomial name
- Nassarius horridus (Dunker, 1847)

Synonyms
- list of synonyms: Buccinum horridum Dunker, 1847(original combination); Buccinum muricatum Quoy & Gaimard, 1882 (invalid: junior homonym of Buccinum muricatum Lightfoot, 1786); Buccinum scabrum Dunker, 1846 (Invalid: junior homonym of Buccinum scabrum Anton, 1838); Hebra curta (Gould, 1850); Hebra horrida (Dunker, 1847); Nassa (Hebra) horrida (Dunker, 1847); Nassa (Hebra) muricata (Quoy & Gaimard, 1833); Nassa curta Gould, 1850; Nassa horrida (Dunker, 1847); Nassa muricata (Quoy & Gaimard, 1882); Nassa muricata var. horrida (Dunker, 1847); Scabronassa horrida (Dunker, 1847)

= Nassarius horridus =

Species of gastropod

Nassarius horridus, common name the horrid nassa, is a species of sea snail, a marine gastropod mollusk in the family Nassariidae, the Nassa mud snails or dog whelks.

== Description ==
The length of the shell varies between 8 mm and 15 mm.

The small shell is ovate, subglobular, and spined. The spire is conical and pointed. It is composed of six or seven whorls. The body whorl is much larger than all the others. The spire presents on its exterior longitudinal folds, upon which are regularly disposed pointed, conical tubercles, which are of the same color as the rest of the shell. The first row of these spines is situated immediately beneath the suture. The last one obliquely intersects the base of the shell. Transverse striae, pretty fine and numerous, are observed between each of the rows of the spines. The white aperture is semilunar. The outer lip is thick and furnished internally with fine striae. The columella is nearly straight, covered by the inner lip which forms a callosity. The color is uniform, of a white fawn, sometimes pale orange.

== Distribution ==
This marine species occurs off Durban, Rep. South Africa, off East Africa; Madagascar, Réunion, Aldabra; and in the Indo-West Pacific: East India, Western Thailand, Papua New Guinea, Indonesia, the Philippines, Indo-Malaysia, Ryukyu Islands, Solomon Islands, Marshall Islands, New Hebrides, New Caledonia, Loyalty Islands, Fiji, Tonga, Samoan Islands, Caroline Islands; and off Australia (Northern Territory, Queensland, Western Australia).
