= Telegony (inheritance) =

Theory of heredity

Telegony is a pseudoscientific theory of heredity holding that offspring can inherit the characteristics of a previous mate of the female parent; thus the child of a woman might partake of traits of a previous sexual partner. Experiments in the late 19th century on several species failed to provide evidence that offspring would inherit any character from their mother's previous mates. It was superseded by the rediscovery of Mendelian inheritance and the Boveri–Sutton chromosome theory.

Although no evidence exists of any true telegenetic mechanism of inheritance, a similar phenomenon whereby environmental (non-genetic) traits of a prior mate affected the development of a subsequent mate's offspring was recently discovered in a species of fly.

== Etymology ==
The term was coined by August Weismann from the Greek words τῆλε (tèle) meaning 'far' and γονος (gonos) meaning 'offspring'. The name may also refer to Odysseus' son Telegonus; the lost poem named after him is Telegony.

== Early perceptions ==
The idea of telegony goes back to Aristotle. It states that individuals can inherit traits not only from their fathers, but also from other males previously known to their mothers. In other words, it was thought that paternity could be shared.

The theory, expounded as part of Aristotle's biology, was accepted throughout Antiquity. The concept of telegonic impregnation was expressed in Greek mythology in the origins of their heroes. Such double fatherhood, one immortal, one mortal, was a familiar feature of heroes such as Theseus, who was doubly conceived in the same night. By the understanding of sex in Antiquity, the mix of semen gave Theseus a combination of divine as well as mortal characteristics. Of a supposed Parnassos, founder of Delphi, Pausanias observes, "Like the other heroes, as they are called, he had two fathers; one they say was the god Poseidon, the human father being Cleopompus." Sometimes the result could be twins such as Castor and Pollux, one born divine and one mortal.

The more general doctrine of "maternal impressions" was also known in Ancient Israel. The book of Genesis describes Jacob inducing goats and sheep in Laban's herds to bear striped and spotted young by placing dark wooden rods with white stripes in their watering troughs. Telegony influenced early Christianity as well. The Gnostic followers of Valentinius (circa 100–160 CE) characteristically took the concept from the physiological world into the realm of psychology and spirituality by extending the supposed influence even to the thoughts of the woman. In the Gospel of Philip, a text among those found at Nag Hammadi:

Whomever the woman loves, to him those who are born are like; if her husband, they are like her husband; if an adulterer, they are like the adulterer. Often when a woman sleeps with her husband, but while her heart is with the adulterer with whom she is accustomed to unite, she bears the one whom she bears so that he is like the adulterer.

The concept of telegony was revived with the rediscovery of Aristotle in the Middle Ages. This was part of the resistance to the marriage in 1361 of Edward the Black Prince, heir to the throne of Edward III of England, with Joan, the Fair Maid of Kent, who had been previously married: their progeny, it was thought, might not be completely of his Plantagenet blood.

== Understandings in the 19th century and the collapse of the theory in the 20th ==
In the 19th century, the most widely credited example was that of Lord Morton's mare, reported by the distinguished surgeon Sir Everard Home, and cited by Charles Darwin. Lord Morton bred a white mare with a wild quagga stallion, and when he later bred the same mare with a white stallion, the offspring strangely had stripes in the legs, like the quagga.

The Surgeon-General of New York, the physiologist Austin Flint, in his Text-Book of Human Physiology (fourth edition, 1888) described the phenomenon as follows:

A peculiar and, it seems to me, an inexplicable fact is, that previous pregnancies have an influence upon offspring. This is well known to breeders of animals. If pure-blooded mares or bitches have been once covered by an inferior male, in subsequent fecondations the young are likely to partake of the character of the first male, even if they be afterwards bred with males of unimpeachable pedigree. What the mechanism of the influence of the first conception is, it is impossible to say; but the fact is incontestable. The same influence is observed in the human subject. A woman may have, by a second husband, children who resemble a former husband, and this is particularly well marked in certain instances by the colour of the hair and eyes. A white woman who has had children by a negro may subsequently bear children to a white man, these children presenting some of the unmistakable peculiarities of the negro race.

Both Schopenhauer and Herbert Spencer found telegony to be a credible theory; August Weismann, on the other hand, had expressed doubts about the theory earlier and it fell out of scientific favor in the 1890s. A series of experiments by James Cossar Ewart in Scotland and other researchers in Germany and Brazil failed to find any evidence of the phenomenon. Also, the statistician Karl Pearson pointed out that, if telegony was true, later children of the same couple should increasingly resemble their father, which is not the case.

Biologists now explain the phenomenon of Lord Morton's mare with reference to the dominant and recessive variants of a gene: both the mare and the stallion had a recessive gene; the foal inherited these alleles and thus displayed the characteristic invisible in its parents.

In mammals, each sperm has the haploid set of chromosomes and each egg has another haploid set. During the process of fertilization a zygote with the diploid set is produced. This set will be inherited by every somatic cell of a mammal, with exactly half the genetic material coming from the producer of the sperm (the father) and another half from the producer of the egg (the mother). Thus, the myth of telegony is fundamentally incompatible with our knowledge of genetics and the reproductive process. Encyclopædia Britannica stated "All these beliefs, from inheritance of acquired traits to telegony, must now be classed as superstitions."

== Recent developments ==
Telegony, once a popular theory among nineteenth century biologists, was largely dismissed with the arrival of Mendelian genetics. However, in 2014 the evolutionary ecologists A. J. Crean and colleagues reported a seemingly telegonic phenomenon in a fly, Telostylinus angusticollis.

As a first step towards disentangling whether the effect is borne by the sperm itself or by accessory-gland products (ACPs) in the seminal fluid, we mated females initially to a male in high or low condition and then remated the female to a new male in high or low condition two weeks later. Interestingly, offspring size and viability were determined by the condition of the first male, with no effect of the condition of the second mate. Genetic tests confirm this result holds even when the second male is the biological father of the offspring. These findings suggest the paternal effect is mediated by ACPs, and provide a compelling case for reassessing the possibility of telegony as a valid phenomenon.

— Crean, Kopps, and Bonduriansky, "Like father like son? Nongenetic paternal effects reinvigorate the possibility of telegony"

Y. S. Liu has proposed possible molecular mechanisms that may account for telegony; however, his work is predicated on the beliefs of pre-Mendelian breeders to reinforce the idea that traits are passed from earlier matings. The proposed mechanisms include the penetration of spermatozoa into the somatic tissues of the female genital tract, the incorporation of the DNA released by spermatozoa into maternal somatic cells, the presence of fetal DNA in maternal blood, incorporation of exogenous DNA into somatic cells, presence of fetal cells and fetal DNA in maternal blood and sperm RNA-mediated non-Mendelian inheritance of epigenetic changes.

== Influence in culture ==
Telegony influenced late 19th-century racialist beliefs. A woman who had a child with a non-Aryan man, it was argued, could never have a "pure" Aryan child at a later point in time. This idea was adopted by the German Nazi Party.

Telegony re-emerged within post-Soviet Russian Orthodoxy. Virginity and Telegony: The Orthodox church and modern science of genetic inversions was published in 2004. Pravda.ru gave an overview of the concept and a brief review of the book, saying that the authors invented "scary and incredible stories" to "make women be very careful about their sexual contacts" and that the idea was being used by the Church to scare the faithful. Anna Kuznetsova, who was appointed Children's Rights Commissioner for the Russian Federation in 2016, had said several years earlier that she believes in the concept, amongst other fringe views. The founding editor of the business newspaper Vedomosti interpreted the appointment of someone with such views as a sign that Russian President Vladimir Putin was becoming more ideological.

The religious practice known as P'ikareum is an unusual variant in that it holds that one can purify one’s own bloodline from sin by having sex with a holy person, such as the founder of one of the religious sects that engages in this practice.

== See also ==
- Epigenetics
- Maternal effect
- Microchimerism
- Racial hygiene
