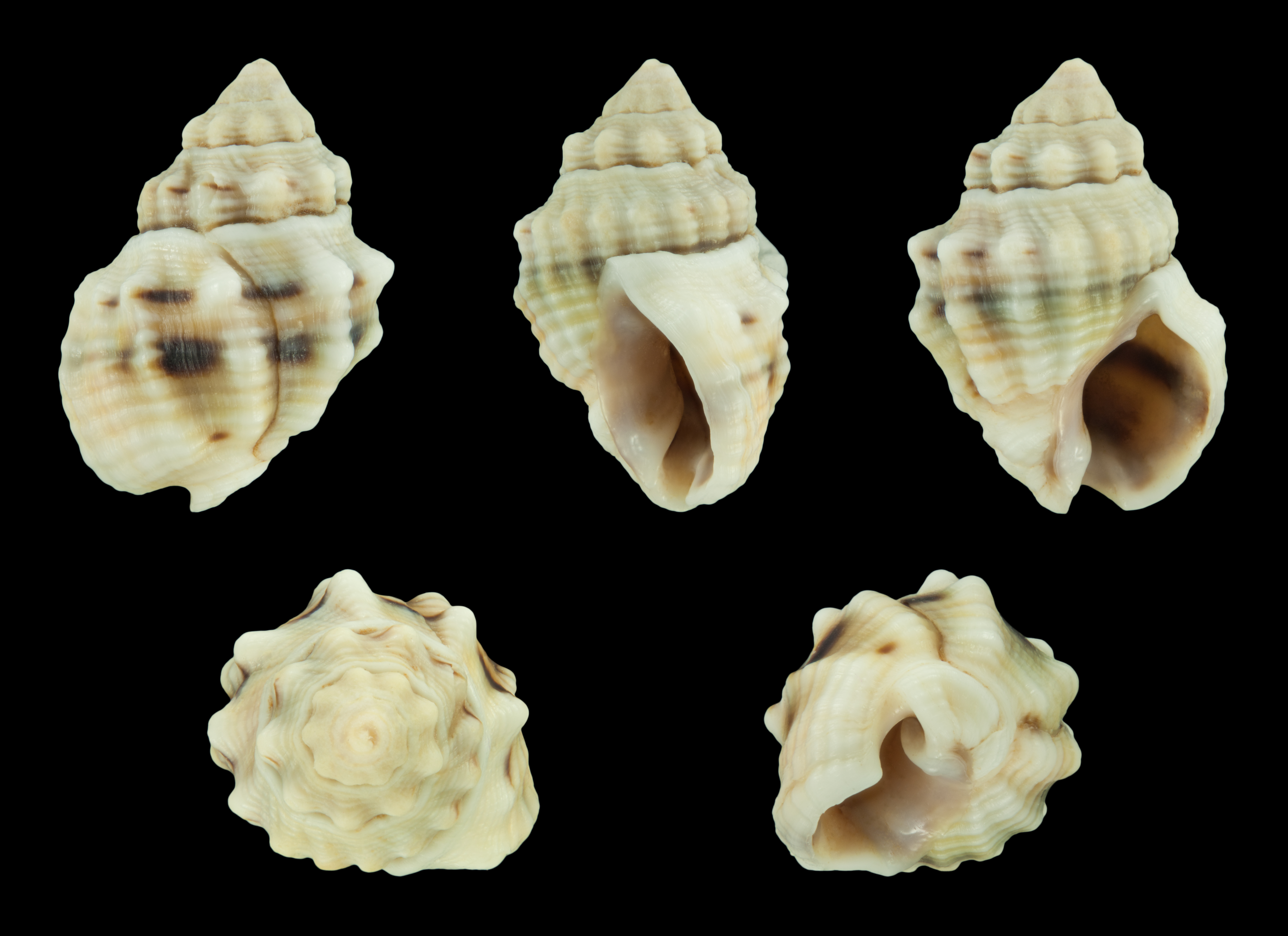
- Five views of a shell of Nassarius subspinosus

Scientific classification
- Kingdom: Animalia
- Phylum: Mollusca
- Class: Gastropoda
- Subclass: Caenogastropoda
- Order: Neogastropoda
- Family: Nassariidae
- Genus: Nassarius
- Species: N. subspinosus

Binomial name
- Nassarius subspinosus (Lamarck, 1822)

Synonyms
- list of synonyms: Buccinum subspinosum Lamarck, 1822; Hebra subspinosa (Lamarck, 1822); Nassa (Hebra) sistroidea G. Nevill & H. Nevill, 1874; Nassa (Hebra) subspinosa (Lamarck, 1822); Nassa (Hima) sistroida G. Nevill & H. Nevill, 1874; Nassa sistroidea G. Nevill & H. Nevill, 1874; Nassa subspinosa (Lamarck, 1822); Nassarius (Hebra) subspinosus (Lamarck, 1822)

= Nassarius subspinosus =

Species of gastropod

Nassarius subspinosus, common name the prickly dog whelk, is a species of sea snail, a marine gastropod mollusk in the family Nassariidae, the nassa mud snails or dog whelks.

== Description ==
The length of the shell varies between 10 mm and 20 mm.

The shell is ovate and conical. The spire is composed of six slightly convex whorls, somewhat flattened at their upper part, ornamented with longitudinal, spinous folds. The body whorl supports two or three rows of spinous, distant tubercles. Besides, the whole shell is crossed by pretty fine, transverse striae, more apparent towards the base. The aperture is sub-rounded. The outer lip is margined externally, and striated internally. The color of this shell is grayish, with irregular transverse bands of a slate or violet color. The tubercles are sometimes white, and often brown lines cross them.

== Distribution ==
This marine species occurs off Central and East Indian Ocean, Tanzania, East India, Andaman Islands, the Philippines, Singapore, Indonesia, Indo-China, China, Oceania (Fiji, Solomon Islands), Papua New Guinea and Australia (Western Australia)
