= Harvey Weiss =

Harvey Weiss is an archaeologist who teaches at Yale University.

== Biography ==
Weiss received his B.A. from The City College, CUNY in 1966, and his Ph.D. degree from the University of Pennsylvania in 1976.

Weiss has directed the Yale University Tell Leilan Project's excavations and surveys in northeastern Syria since 1978. His most recent contribution to environmental archaeology has been his hypothesis that abrupt, century-scale, climate changes altered prehistoric and ancient West Asian societies' developmental trajectories, such as the abrupt climate change 4,200 years before present that reduced agricultural production in northern Mesopotamia, forced regional abandonment and habitat-tracking, disrupted Akkadian imperial revenues, and thereby forced the political collapse in southern Mesopotamia.
