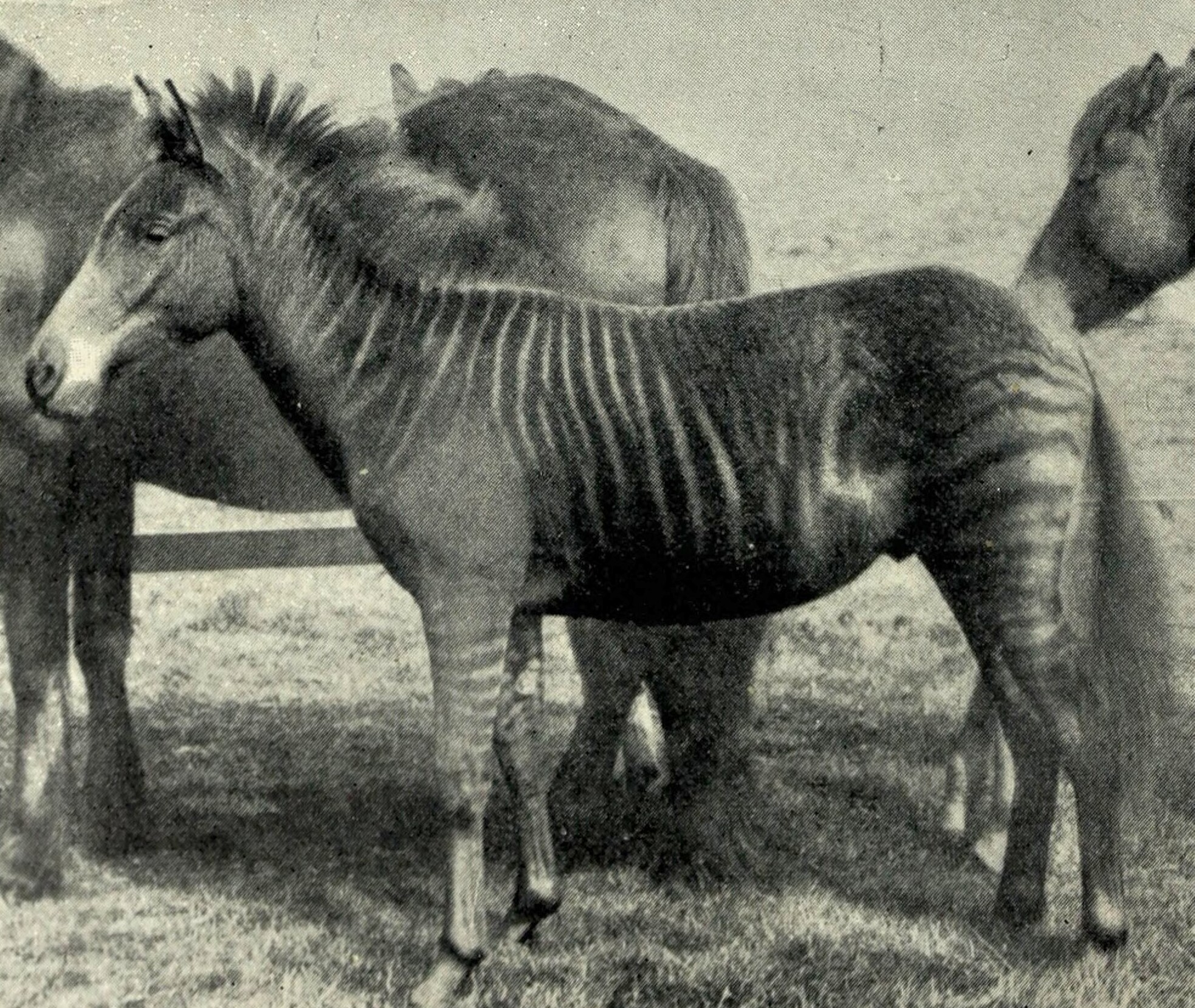
- A zorse in an 1899 photograph, "Romulus: one year old", from J. C. Ewart's The Penycuik Experiments

Scientific classification
- Kingdom: Animalia
- Phylum: Chordata
- Class: Mammalia
- Order: Perissodactyla
- Family: Equidae
- Subtribe: Equina
- Genus: Equus
- Species: E. "zebra" × E. "equine"

= Zebroid =

Offspring of a zebra and any other equine

A zebroid is the offspring of any cross between a zebra and any other equine to create a hybrid. In most cases, the sire is a zebra stallion but not every time. The offspring of a donkey sire and zebra dam, called a donkra, and the offspring of a horse sire and a zebra dam, called a hebra, do exist, but are rare and are usually sterile. Zebroids have been bred since the 19th century. Charles Darwin noted several zebra hybrids in his works.

== Types ==
Zebroid is the term generally used for all zebra hybrids. The different hybrids are generally named using a portmanteau of the sire's name and the dam's name. Generally, no distinction is made as to which zebra species is used. Many times, when zebras are crossbred, they develop some form of dwarfism. Breeding of different branches of the equine family, which does not occur in the wild, generally results in sterile offspring. The combination of sire and dam also affects the offspring phenotype.

A zorse is the offspring of a zebra stallion and a horse mare. This cross is also called a zebrose, zebrula, zebrule, or zebra mule. The rarer reverse pairing is sometimes called a hebra, horsebra, zebrinny, or zebra hinny. The zorse is sterile.

A zony is the offspring of a zebra stallion and a pony mare. Medium-sized pony mares are preferred to produce riding zonies, but zebras have been crossed with smaller pony breeds such as the Shetland, resulting in so-called "Zetlands".

A cross between a zebra and a donkey is known as a zenkey, zonkey (a term also used for donkeys in Tijuana, Mexico, painted as zebras for tourists to pose with them in souvenir photos), zebrass, or zedonk. Donkeys are closely related to zebras and both animals belong to the horse family. These zebra–donkey hybrids are very rare. In South Africa, they occur where zebras and donkeys are found in proximity to each other. Like mules and hinnies, however, they are generally genetically unable to breed, due to an odd number of chromosomes disrupting meiosis.

== Genetics ==
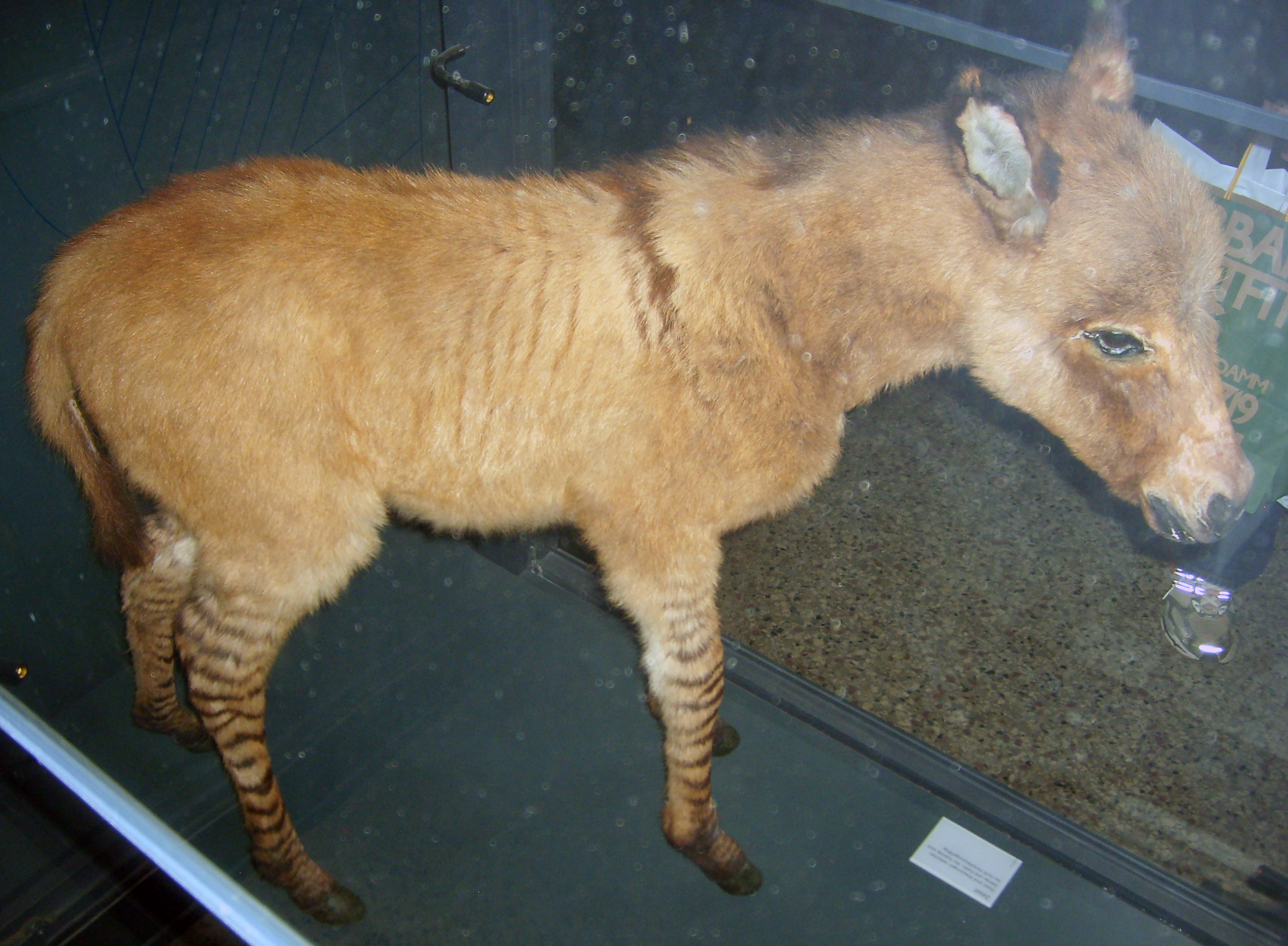
Cross between a donkey and a zebra at Naturkunde Museum, Berlin

Living equids show wide variation in the number of chromosomes, ranging from a diploid number of 32 chromosomes in the mountain zebra to 66 in Przewalski's horse. This is due to several chromosomal fusion and fission events during the evolution of equids. The zebra has between 32 and 46 chromosomes depending on the species.

In spite of this difference, viable hybrids are possible, provided the gene combination in the hybrid allows for embryonic development to birth. A hybrid will have a number of chromosomes exactly halfway between that of its parents; for example, a cross between a horse (64 chromosomes), and a plains zebra (44 chromosomes), will produce a zebroid offspring with 54 chromosomes. The chromosome difference makes female hybrids poorly fertile and male hybrids generally sterile, due to a phenomenon called Haldane's rule. The evolutionary biologist J. B. S. Haldane first recorded in 1922 that genetic hybrids are often inviable or sterile. Since none of the males are fertile, the females must be paired with either a donkey or a zebra. The difference in chromosome number is most likely due to horses having two longer chromosomes that contain similar gene content to four zebra chromosomes.

=== Extant Equus species: chromosome number ===
Subgenus	Scientific name	Common name	Chromosome number (2n)
Hippotigris (zebras)	Equus zebra	Mountain zebra	32
Hippotigris (zebras)	Equus grevyi	Grévy's zebra	46
Hippotigris (zebras)	Equus quagga	Plains zebra	44
Asinus (asses)	Equus africanus	African wild ass; includes domestic donkey	62
Asinus (asses)	Equus hemionus	Onager, hemione, or Asiatic wild ass	56
Asinus (asses)	Equus kiang	Kiang	52
Equus (horses)	Equus ferus caballus	Domestic horse	64
Equus (horses)	Equus ferus przewalskii	Przewalski's horse	66

Zebras are more closely related to wild asses (a group which includes donkeys) than to horses. The horse lineage diverged from other equids an estimated 4.0 - 4.7 million years ago; zebras and asses diverged an estimated 1.69–1.99 million years ago. The cladogram of Equus below is simplified from Vistrup et al. (2013).

- Equus
  - - - Zebras
        - Mountain zebra (E. zebra)
        - - Plains zebra (E. quagga)
          - Grévy's zebra (E. grevyi)
      - Wild asses
        - - Kiang (E. kiang)
          - Onager (E. hemionus)
        - African wild ass (E. africanus)
  - Horses
    - Domestic horse (E. ferus caballus)
    - Przewalski's horse (E. ferus przewalski)

== Physical characteristics ==
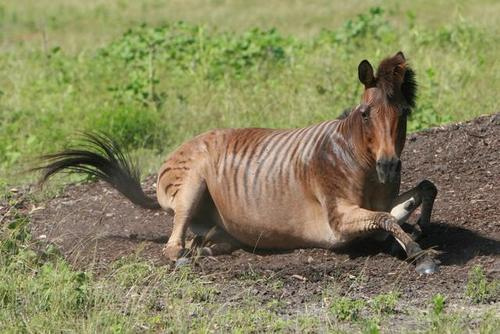
A zorse

Zebroids physically resemble their nonzebra parent, but are striped like a zebra. The stripes generally do not cover the whole body and might be confined to the legs, or spread onto parts of the body or neck. If the non-zebra parent was patterned (such as a roan, Appaloosa, pinto/paint, piebald, or skewbald), this pattern might be passed down to the zebroid, in which case the stripes are usually confined to non-white areas. The alternative name "golden zebra" relates to the interaction of zebra striping and a horse's bay or chestnut colour to give a zebra-like black-on-bay or black-on-chestnut pattern that superficially resembles the extinct quagga. Zebra–donkey hybrids usually have a dorsal (back) stripe and a ventral (belly) stripe.

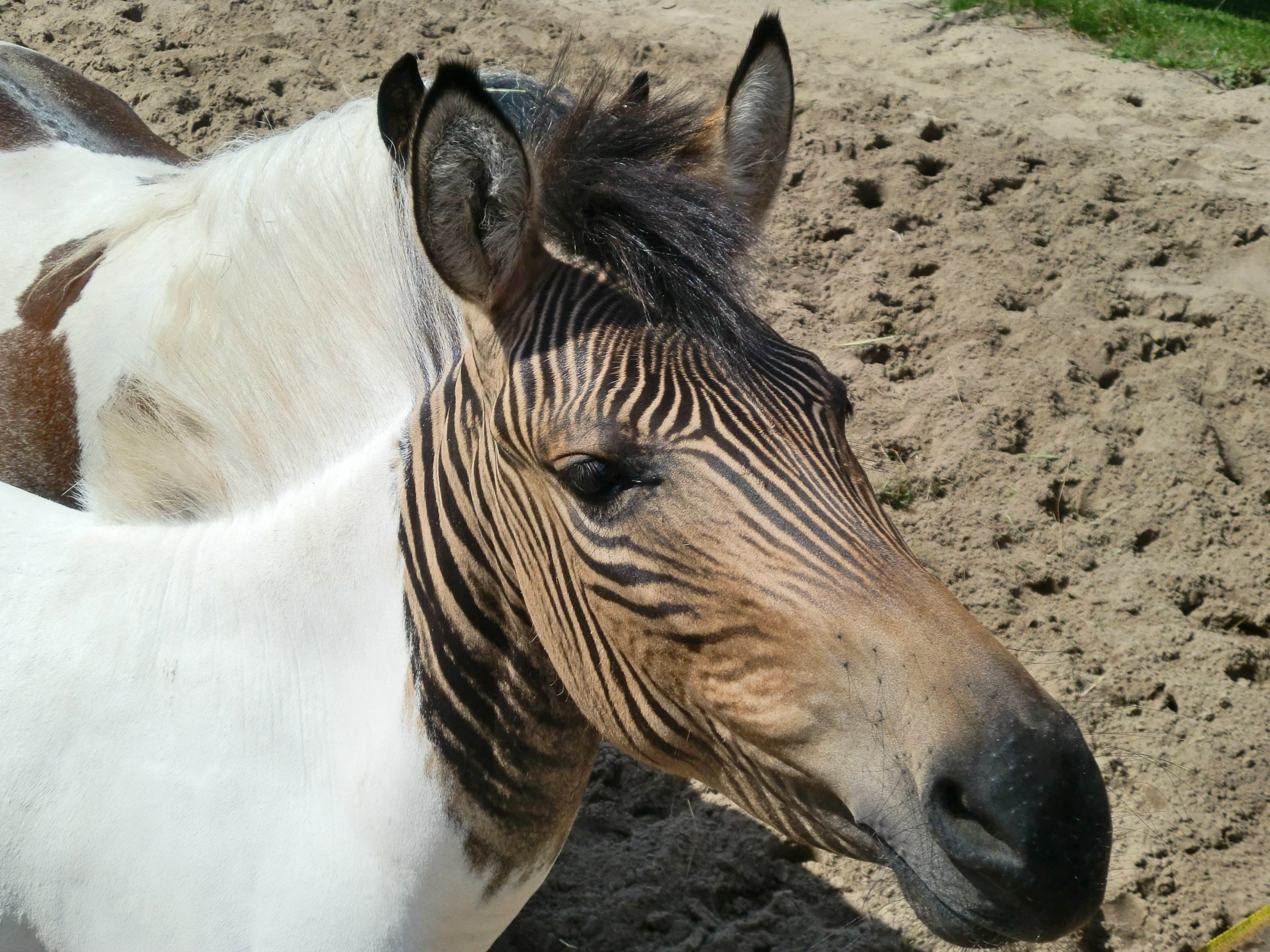
The hebra Eclyse

Zorses combine the zebra striping overlaid on coloured areas of the hybrid's coat. Zorses are most often bred using solid-colored horses. If the horse parent is piebald (black and white) or skewbald (color other than black and white), the zorse may inherit the dominant depigmentation genes for white patches. The tobiano (the most common white modifier found in the horse) directly interacts with the zorse coat to give it white markings. Only the non-depigmented areas will have zebra striping, resulting in a zorse with white patches and striped patches. This effect is seen in the zebroid named Eclyse (a hebra rather than a zorse) born in Stukenbrock, Germany, in 2007 to a zebra mare called Eclipse and a horse stallion called Ulysses.

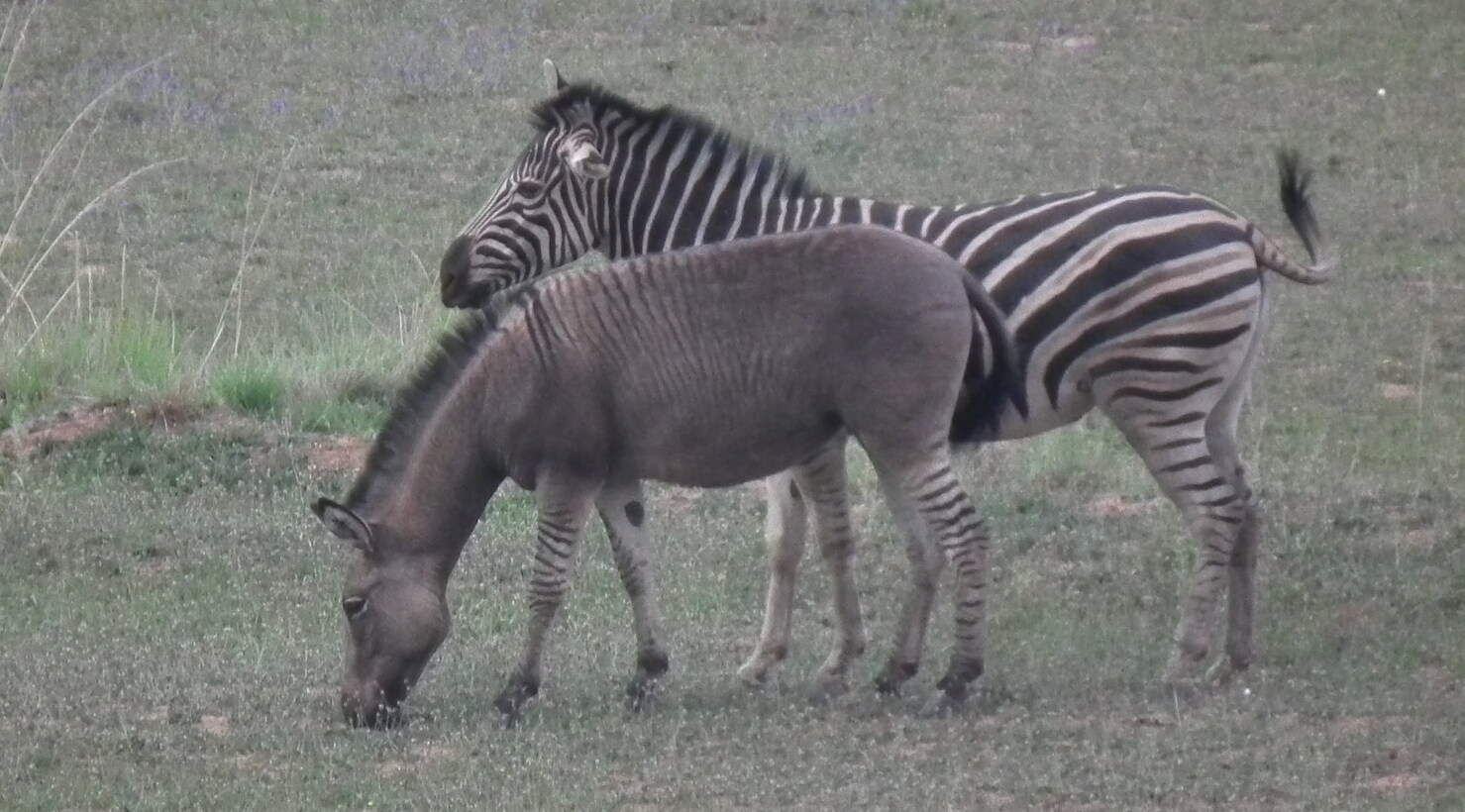
Donkey × plains zebra hybrid, in South Africa

Zonkeys tend to be either tan, brown or grey in colour from their donkey parent with a lighter underside, and it is on the lighter parts of their body like their legs and belly with stripes on some parts from their zebra parent.

Zebroids are preferred over zebras for practical uses, such as riding, because the zebra has a different body shape from a horse or a donkey and, consequently, it is difficult to find tack to fit a zebra. However, a zebroid is usually more inclined to be temperamental than a purebred horse and can be difficult to handle. Zebras, being wild animals and not domesticated like horses and donkeys, can pass on their wild traits to their offspring. Zebras, while not usually very large, are extremely strong and aggressive. Similarly, zorses have a strong temperament and can be aggressive.

== Historical and notable zebroids ==
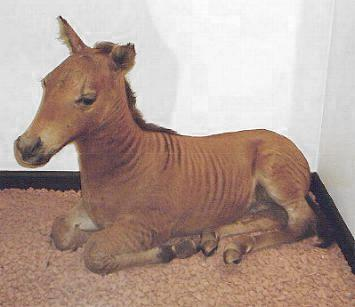
Zebra-horse hybrid foal with quagga-like markings, Walter Rothschild Zoological Museum, Tring, England

In 1815, Lord Morton mated a quagga stallion to a chestnut Arabian mare. The result was a female hybrid which resembled both parents. This provoked the interest of Cossar Ewart, Professor of Natural History at Edinburgh (1882-1927) and a keen geneticist. Ewart crossed a zebra stallion with pony mares to investigate the theory of telegony, or paternal impression. In The Origin of Species (1859), Charles Darwin mentioned four colored drawings of hybrids between the ass and zebra. He also wrote

In Lord Morton's famous hybrid from a chestnut mare and male quagga, the hybrid, and even the pure offspring subsequently produced from the mare by a black Arabian sire, were much more plainly barred across the legs than is even the pure quagga.

In his book The Variation of Animals and Plants Under Domestication, Darwin described a hybrid ass-zebra specimen in the British Museum as being dappled on its flanks. He also mentioned a "triple hybrid, from a bay mare, by a hybrid from a male ass and female zebra" displayed at London Zoo. This would have required the zebroid sire to be fertile.

During the South African War, the Boers crossed Chapman's zebras with ponies to produce animals for transport work, chiefly for hauling guns. A specimen was captured by British forces, presented to King Edward VII by Lord Kitchener and photographed by W. S. Berridge. Zebras are resistant to sleeping sickness, whereas purebred horses and ponies are not, and zebra mules hopefully would inherit this resistance.

Grévy's zebra has been crossed with the Somali wild ass in the early 20th century. Zorses were bred by the U.S. government and reported in Genetics in Relation to Agriculture by E. B. Babcock and R. E. Clausen (early 20th century), in an attempt to investigate inheritance and telegony. The experiments were also reported in The Science of Life by H. G. Wells, J. Huxley and G. P. Wells (around 1929).

Interest in zebra crosses continued in the 1970s. In 1973, a cross between a zebra and a donkey was foaled at the Jerusalem Zoo. They called it a "hamzab". In the 1970s, the Colchester Zoo bred zedonks, at first by accident and later to create a disease-resistant riding and draft animal. The experiment was discontinued when zoos became more conservation-minded. A number of hybrids were kept at the zoo after this; the last one died in 2009. As of 2010, one adult still remained at the tourist attraction of Groombridge Place near Tunbridge Wells in Kent.

=== 21st century ===
Today, various zebroids are bred as riding and draft animals and as curiosities in circuses and smaller zoos. A zorse (more accurately a zony) was born at Eden Ostrich World, Cumbria, England in 2001, after a zebra was left in a field with a Shetland pony. It was referred to as a Zetland. Usually, a zebra stallion is paired with a horse mare or donkey jenny, but in 2005, a Burchell's zebra mare named Allison produced a zonkey called Alex, sired by a donkey jack at Highland Plantation in the parish of Saint Thomas, Barbados. Alex, born 21 April 2005, is apparently the first zonkey in Barbados. In 2007, a horse stallion, Ulysses, and a zebra mare, Eclipse, produced a hebra named Eclyse, displaying an unusually patchy color coating. In July 2010, a zonkey was born at the Chestatee Wildlife Preserve in Dahlonega, Georgia. Another zebra–donkey hybrid, like the Barbados zonkey sired by a donkey, was born 3 July 2011 in Haicang Safari Park, Haicang, Xiamen. A zonkey, Ippo, was born 21 July 2013 in an animal reserve in Florence. Khumba, the offspring of a zebra mare and a dwarf albino donkey jack, was born on 21 April 2014 in the zoo of Reynosa in the state of Tamaulipas, Mexico. More recently, in November 2018 at a farm in Somerset, a cross between a donkey jack and a zebra mare was born. The male foal was described as a zonkey by its owner and has been named Zippy.

== See also ==
- Equid hybrid
- Hinny
- Mule
- Zebro
