= Partible paternity =

Cultural concept where in paternity, a child is understood to have more than one father

Partible paternity or shared paternity is a cultural conceptualization of paternity according to which a child is understood to have more than one father; for example, because of an ideology that sees pregnancy as the cumulative result of multiple acts of sexual intercourse. In societies with the concept of partible paternity this often results in the nurture of a child being shared by multiple fathers in a form of polyandric relation to the mother, although this is not always the case.

All cultures recognize different types of fatherhood – for example the distinction between biological fatherhood and legal fatherhood, and the corresponding social roles of genitor and pater. The concept of partible paternity differs from such a distinction because it considers all men who have had sexual intercourse with a woman immediately prior to and during her pregnancy to have contributed biological material to the child, and to have a corresponding legal or moral responsibility to care for it.

Up to 70% of Amazonian cultures may have believed in the principle of partible paternity, and it has been described in at least 18 different societies including the Araweté, Mehinaku, Tapirapé, Xokleng, and Wari', along with the Aché and Kulina.

Anthropologist Stephen Beckerman, who has studied ideologies and practices of fatherhood among the Barí people of Venezuela, argues that partible paternity is adaptive, because it gives an advantage to children who have multiple male providers. He suggests a Bari child is 16% more likely than a single-fathered child to survive to the age of 15, probably due to improved nutrition. Among the Aché people of Eastern Paraguay, having multiple fathers appears to protect children from violence, the main cause of infant and child mortality. Evolutionary psychologist David Buss suggests that there must also be a downside to partible paternity, in the form of sexual jealousy. It has been suggested that societies with partible paternity lack sexual jealousy, as men do not have to worry about paternal uncertainty; however, this view has also been subject to criticism and it has been argued sexual jealousy is in fact still present in partible paternity societies.

Partible paternity have also been suggested to be used by some males to benefit themselves by increasing their access to extramarital partners and to formalise alliances with other males by allowing sexual access to their wives, as well as sharing paternity with close kin members.

In ancient Hawaii, partible paternity was called poʻolua. Hawaiian king Kamehameha I is said to have had two fathers.

In The Gallic Wars, Book one, Chapter 14, Julius Caesar writes about the Celts who inhabited Kent in England:

Ten and even twelve have wives common to them, and particularly brothers among brothers, and parents among their children; but if there be any issue by these wives, they are reputed to be the children of those by whom respectively each was first espoused when a virgin.

== See also ==
- Telegony (pregnancy)
